= So You Think You Can Dance Canada season 4 =

So You Think You Can Dance Canada
- Season 4
- Hosted by: Leah Miller
- Judges: Jean-Marc Généreux; Tré Armstrong; Blake McGrath; Luther Brown
- Winner: Jordan Clark
- Runner-up: Melissa Mitro

Release
- Original network: CTV
- Original release: June 20 – September 11, 2011

Season chronology
- ← Previous; Season 3

Season 4 of So You Think You Can Dance Canada is a dance reality show and competition that airs on CTV. It is hosted by ETalk correspondent Leah Miller. It was the last season of the Canadian version of SYTYCD.

== Auditions ==
Open auditions for this season were held in the following locations, with one or two guest judges joining Jean-Marc, Tré, and Luther at the Judges' Table:

| Audition Venue | City | Date | Guest Judge(s) |
| Metro Toronto Convention Centre | Toronto, Ontario | November 20, 2010 | Mary Murphy, Rex Harrington |
| The Centre in Vancouver for the Performing Arts | Vancouver, British Columbia | December 11, 2010 | Mia Michaels |
| Citadel Theatre | Edmonton, Alberta | December 4, 2010 | Stacey Tookey |
| Imperial Theatre | Saint John, New Brunswick | November 6, 2010 | Sean Cheesman, Melissa Williams |
| Théâtre Saint-Denis | Montreal, Quebec | | Mary Murphy |

=== Finals Week ===
Judges: Jean-Marc Généreux, Tré Armstrong, Blake McGrath, Luther Brown, Mary Murphy, Nico Archambault, Sean Cheesman, France Mousseau, Rex Harrington

| Task/style | Music | Choreographer(s) |
| Hip-Hop | "The Show Goes On"—Lupe Fiasco | Luther Brown |
| Afro-Jazz | | Sean Cheesman |
| Cha-cha | "Yeah 3x"—Chris Brown | Jean-Marc Généreux and France Mousseau |
| Group routines | Picked out of a hat | The dancers |
| Contemporary | "Turning Tables"—Adele | Blake McGrath |
| Individual solo | Music chosen by competitor | The dancer |

== Finals ==
=== Elimination chart ===
The song played for the eliminated female contestants is "This Is My Now" by Jordin Sparks. The song played for the eliminated male contestants is "Life After You" by Daughtry.

Legend
| Female | Male | Bottom 3 Couples | Bottom 4 Contestants |

| | Week: | 07/12 | 07/19 | 07/26 | 08/02 | 08/09 | 08/16 | 08/23 | 08/30 | 09/11 |
| | Contestant | Result | | | | | | | | |
| Top 6 | Jordan Clark | | | | Btm 3 | | | | | WINNER |
| Top 6 | Melissa Mitro | | | | | | | Btm 6 | Btm 4 | Runner-Up |
| Top 6 | Matt Marr | | | | | | | | | 3rd Place |
| Top 6 | Christian Millette | | | | | | Btm 3 | Btm 6 | | Elim |
| Top 6 | Lindsay Leuschner | | | | | | Btm 3 | | | Elim |
| Top 6 | Shane Simpson | | | | Btm 3 | Btm 3 | Btm 3 | | Btm 4 | Elim |
| Top 8 | Adam LoPapa | | | Btm 3 | | | | Btm 6 | Elim | |
| Top 8 | Denitsa Ikonomova | | Btm 3 | | Btm 3 | | | Btm 6 | Elim | |
| Top 10 | François Pruneau | Btm 3 | | Btm 3 | | | | Elim | | |
| Top 10 | Yuliya Zavadska | | | Btm 3 | | Btm 3 | Btm 3 | Elim | | |
| Top 12 | Joey Arrigo | | | | Btm 3 | Btm 3 | Elim | | | |
| Top 12 | Geisha Chin | Btm 3 | | Btm 3 | | Btm 3 | Elim | | | |
| Top 14 | JP Dubé | | Btm 3 | | | Elim | | | | |
| Top 14 | Carlena Britch | | Btm 3 | | | Elim | | | | |
| Top 16 | Kevin Howe | | | | Elim | | | | | |
| Top 16 | Shelaina Anderson | | | | Elim | | | | | |
| Top 18 | Dwayne Gulston | | Btm 3 | Elim | | | | | | |
| Top 18 | Teya Wild | | | Elim | | | | | | |
| Top 20 | Rodrigo Basurto | Btm 3 | Elim | | | | | | | |
| Top 20 | Lauren Lyn | Btm 3 | Elim | | | | | | | |
| Top 22 | Adam Asselin-Rioux | Elim | | | | | | | | |
| Top 22 | Cassandra Flammini | Elim | | | | | | | | |

=== Women ===
| Contestant | Age | Home Town | Dance Style | Week Of Elimination |
|---|---|---|---|---|
| Jordan Clark | 19 | Tottenham, Ontario | Contemporary | Winner |
| Melissa Mitro | 23 | Richmond Hill, Ontario | Contemporary | Runner Up |
| Lindsay Leuschner | 19 | Stouffville, Ontario | Contemporary | Fifth Place |
| Denitsa Ikonomova | 24 | Laval, Quebec | Ballroom | Top 8 |
| Yuliya Zavadska | 29 | Toronto, Ontario | Ballroom | Top 10 |
| Geisha Chin | 19 | Toronto, Ontario | Contemporary | Top 12 |
| Carlena Britch | 20 | Vancouver, British Columbia | Hip Hop | Top 14 |
| Shelaina Anderson | 20 | Edmonton, Alberta | Contemporary | Top 16 |
| Teya Wild | 23 | Vancouver, British Columbia | Hip Hop | Top 18 |
| Lauren Lyn | 21 | Toronto, Ontario | Salsa | Top 20 |
| Cassandra Flammini | 18 | Etobicoke, Ontario | Jazz | Top 22 |

=== Men ===
| Contestant | Age | Home Town | Dance Style | Week Of Elimination |
|---|---|---|---|---|
| Matthew Marr | 20 | Quispamsis, New Brunswick | Contemporary | Third Place |
| Christian Millette | 28 | Montreal, Quebec | Ballroom | Fourth Place |
| Shane Simpson | 24 | Thornhill, Ontario | Contemporary | Sixth Place |
| Adam LoPapa | 19 | Woodbridge, Ontario | Jazz | Top 8 |
| François Pruneau | 26 | Trois-Rivières, Quebec | Ballroom | Top 10 |
| Joey Arrigo | 19 | Newmarket, Ontario | Contemporary | Top 12 |
| JP Dubé | 19 | Montreal, Quebec | Hip Hop | Top 14 |
| Kevin Howe | 22 | Ottawa, Ontario | Contemporary | Top 16 |
| Dwayne Gulston | 23 | Toronto, Ontario | Hip Hop | Top 18 |
| Rodrigo Basurto | 26 | Toronto, Ontario | Hip Hop | Top 20 |
| Adam Asselin-Rioux | 22 | St-Jean-sur-Richelieu, Québec | Contemporary | Top 22 |

== Performances ==
=== Week 1 (July 11, 2011) ===
Judges: Jean-Marc Généreux, Tré Armstrong, Blake McGrath, Luther Brown, Mary Murphy

| Contestants | Style | Music | Choreographer(s) | Result |
| Lindsay Leuschner; Christian Millette | Salsa | "Salsa Dura"—La Excelencia | Tony Meredith; Melanie LaPatin | Safe |
| Jordan Clark; Joey Arrigo | Contemporary | "For the People"—Mark Huculak | Stacey Tookey | Safe |
| Denitsa Ikonomova; JP Dubé | Hip-hop | "Somebody to Love"—Justin Bieber feat. Usher | Tucker Barkley | Safe |
| Shelaina Anderson; Matt Marr | Contemporary | "The Nutcracker, Op. 71: Act II Pas De Deux: The Sugar Plum Fairy and Prince Orgead - Tarentella, Dance of the Sugar Plum Fairy—Slovak Radio Symphony Orchestra/Ondrej Lenard "Sofi Needs a Ladder"—Deadmau5 | Sabrina Matthews | Safe |
| Yuliya Zavadska; Adam LoPapa | Musical theatre | "Oh, Boy!"—Buddy Holly | Melissa Williams | Safe |
| Cassandra Flammini; François Pruneau | Rumba | "Alone Again"—Alyssa Reid feat. P. Reign | Eric Caty; Kelly Lanaan | Flammini eliminated |
| Carlena Britch; Dwayne "Boneless" Gulston | Hip-hop | "Super Bass"—Nicki Minaj | Steve Bolton | Safe |
| Teya Wild; Kevin Howe | Contemporary | "You Lost Me"—Christina Aguilera | Stacey Tookey | Safe |
| Lauren Lyn; Rodrigo Basurto | Cha-cha-cha | "El Sol de la Noche"—Salsa Celtica | Gustavo Vargas | Bottom 3 |
| Geisha Chin; Adam Asselin-Rioux | New Disco | "The Edge of Glory"—Lady Gaga | Melissa Williams | Asselin-Rioux eliminated |
| Melissa Mitro; Shane Simpson | African jazz | "Umeta We Nkosi"—Soweto Gospel Choir | Sean Cheesman | Safe |

=== Week 2 (July 18, 2011) ===
Judges: Jean-Marc Généreux, Tré Armstrong, Rex Harrington, Mary Murphy

| Contestants | Style | Music | Choreographer(s) | Result |
| Lauren Lyn; Rodrigo Basurto | Hip-hop | "Look at Me Now"—Chris Brown feat. Busta Rhymes & Lil Wayne | Luther Brown | Both Eliminated |
| Lindsay Leuschner; Christian Millette | Contemporary | "1+1"—Beyoncé Knowles | Blake McGrath | Safe |
| Denitsa Ikonomova; JP Dubé | Jive | "Blue Suede Shoes"—Elvis Presley | Danny Arbour | Bottom 3 |
| Carlena Britch; Dwayne Gulston | Dancehall | "Star Bwoy"—Mavado | Jae Blaze | Bottom 3 |
| Teya Wild; Kevin Howe | Viennese Waltz | "Good to You"—Marianas Trench feat. Jessica Lee | Pierre Allaire | Safe |
| Geisha Chin; François Pruneau | Hip-hop | "Roman's Revenge"—Nicki Minaj feat. Lil Wayne | Tucker Barkley | Safe |
| Yuliya Zavadska; Adam LoPapa | Samba | "Samba"—Ganga Girl | Gustavo Vargas | Safe |
| Melissa Mitro; Shane Simpson | Contemporary | "This Year's Love"—David Gray | Sabrina Matthews | Safe |
| Shelaina Anderson; Matt Marr | Hustle | "Melody of Love (Wanna Be Loved)"—Donna Summer | Maria Torres | Safe |
| Jordan Clark; Joey Arrigo | Jazz | "That's Life"—Frank Sinatra | Sean Cheesman | Safe |

=== Week 3 (July 25, 2011) ===
Judges: Jean-Marc Généreux, Tré Armstrong, Nico Archambault, Mary Murphy

| Contestants | Style | Music | Choreographer(s) | Result |
| Jordan Clark; Christian Milliette | Paso Doble | "Lacrimosa Dominae"—Serge Colbert (for Immediate Music) "Firebender" —Immediate Music (Jeffrey Fayman, Yoav Goren) | Natalie Reznik; Francis Lafrenière | Safe |
| Denitsa Ikonomova; Matt Marr | Contemporary | "Can't Breathe"—Fefe Dobson | Sabrina Matthews | Safe |
| Carlena Britch; Kevin Howe | Hip-hop | "Clear!"—Kardinal Official | Sho-Tyme | Safe |
| Lindsay Leuschner; Shane Simpson | Disco | "Shake Your Groove Thing"—Peaches & Herb | Melissa Williams | Safe |
| Geisha Chin; Adam LoPapa | Jazz | "Who's That Chick?"—David Guetta feat. Rihanna | Blake McGrath | Bottom 3 |
| Yuliya Zavadska; François Pruneau | Mambo | "Mambo Gozon"—Tito Puente | Gustavo Vargas | Bottom 3 |
| Shelaina Anderson; JP Dubé | Bollywood | "Baawre" from Luck By Chance | Longinus Fernandes | Safe |
| Teya Wild; Dwayne Gultson | Krump | "Get Krazy"—Buckmouth | Lil C | Both eliminated |
| Melissa Mitro; Joey Arrigo | Contemporary | "I Wanna Dance With Somebody"—The Side Project | Mandy Moore | Safe |

=== Week 4 (August 1, 2011) ===
Judges: Jean-Marc Généreux, Tré Armstrong, Sergio Trujillo, Dan Karaty

| Contestants | Style | Music | Choreographer(s) | Result |
| Lindsay Leuschner; François Pruneau | Hip-hop | "Massive Attack"—Nicki Minaj feat. Sean Garrett | Luther Brown | Safe |
| Jordan Clark; Shane Simpson | Contemporary | "Wake Up Alone"—Amy Winehouse | Nico Archambault; Wynn Holmes | Bottom 3 |
| Yuliya Zavadska; Matt Marr | Quickstep | "Can't Touch It"—Ricki-Lee Coulter | Tony Meredith; Melanie LaPatin | Safe |
| Melissa Mitro; Christian Millette | Tango | "La Bohemia"—Electric Dub Tango | Tony Meredith; Melanie LaPatin | Safe |
| Geisha Chin; JP Dubé | House | "What I Need"—Crystal Waters | Sho-Tyme | Safe |
| Shelaina Anderson; Kevin Howe | Contemporary | "Rolling in the Deep"—Adele | Sabrina Matthews | Both eliminated |
| Denitsa Ikonomova; Joey Arrigo | Salsa | "Mirami"—Chivirico Dávila | Gustavo Vargas | Bottom 3 |
| Carlena Britch; Adam LoPapa | Broadway | "Kiss of the Spider Woman"—Chita Rivera | Sean Cheesman | Safe |

=== Week 5 (August 8, 2011) ===
Judges: Jean-Marc Généreux, Tré Armstrong, Dan Karaty, Melissa Williams, Rex Harrington

| Contestants | Style | Music | Choreographer(s) | Result |
| Jordan Clark; François Pruneau | Samba | "Chillando Goma"—Fulanito | Gustavo Vargas | Safe |
| Geisha Chin; Joey Arrigo | Contemporary | "Gasoline Rainbows"—Amy Kuney | Stacey Tookey | Bottom 3 |
| Yuliya Zavadska; JP Dubé | Hip-hop | "Give Em What They Askin' For"—Busta Rhymes | Sho-Tyme | Dubé eliminated |
| Lindsay Leuschner; Christian Millette | Pop Jazz | "Blow (Cirkut Remix)"—Kesha | Blake McGrath | Safe |
| Denitsa Ikonomova; Matt Marr | Cha-cha | "Give Me Everything"—Pitbull feat. Ne-Yo, Afrojack & Nayer | Francis Lafrenière; Claudia Primeau | Safe |
| Carlena Britch; Shane Simpson | Contemporary | "Wise Up"—Aimee Mann | Sabrina Matthews | Britch eliminated |
| Melissa Mitro; Adam LoPapa | Hip-hop | "Buyou"—Keri Hilson feat. J. Cole | Luther Brown | Safe |

=== Week 6 (August 15, 2011) ===
Judges: Jean-Marc Généreux, Tré Armstrong, Blake McGrath, Luther Brown, Mary Murphy

| Contestants | Style | Music | Choreographer(s) | Result |
| Lindsay Leuschner; Christian Millette | Salsa | "Aguanile"—Hector Lavoe | Francis Lafrenière; Claudia Primeau | Bottom 3 |
| Melissa Mitro; Adam LoPapa | Contemporary | "Set Fire to the Rain"–Adele | Sabrina Matthews | Safe |
| Denitsa Ikonomova; Matt Marr | Hip-hop | "C'Mon (Catch 'Em By Surprise)"—Diplo vs. Tiesto feat. Busta Rhymes | Steve Bolton | Safe |
| Yuliya Zavadska; Shane Simpson | Jive | "Thunder on the Mountain"—Wanda Jackson feat. Jack White | Danny Arbour | Bottom 3 |
| Geisha Chin; Joey Arrigo | African Jazz | "Jungle"—Hilight Tribe | Sean Cheesman | Both eliminated |
| Jordan Clark; François Pruneau | Contemporary | "Let Go"—Frou Frou | Sabrina Matthews | Safe |

=== Week 7 (August 22, 2011) ===
Judges: Jean-Marc Généreux, Tré Armstrong, Stacey Tookey, Mary Murphy

| Contestants | Style | Music | Choreographer(s) | Result |
| Denitsa Ikonomova; François Pruneau | Mambo | "Bemba Colora"—Celia Cruz | Gustavo Vargas | Ikonomova in bottom 6 Pruneau eliminated |
| Lindsay Leuschner; Adam LoPapa | Contemporary | "Remember When It Rained"—Josh Groban | Blake McGrath | LoPapa in bottom 6 |
| Melissa Mitro; Shane Simpson | Hip-hop | "The Time (Dirty Bit)"—The Black Eyed Peas | Luther Brown | Mitro in bottom 6 |
| Yuliya Zavadska; Matt Marr | Contemporary | "My Love"—Sia | Sabrina Matthews | Zavadska eliminated |
| Jordan Clark; Christian Millette | Jazz | "Skin"—Rihanna | Sean Cheesman | Millette in bottom 6 |

- Solos:

| Contestant | Style | Music | Result |
| Lindsay Leuschner | Contemporary | "It Doesn't Hurt"—Katie Thompson | Safe |
| Adam LoPopa | Jazz | "You Should Be Dancing"—The Bee Gees | Bottom 6 |
| Christian Millette | Samba | "Happy" (Spiritual South Go Happy in Rio Remix)—Max Sedgley | Bottom 6 |
| Jordan Clark | Contemporary | "Hometown Glory"—Adele | Safe |
| Yuliya Zavadska | Foxtrot | "Fever"—Peggy Lee | Eliminated |
| Matt Marr | Contemporary | "For the Nights I Can't Remember"—Hedley | Safe |
| Melissa Mitro | Contemporary | "To Build a Home"—The Cinematic Orchestra | Bottom 6 |
| Shane Simpson | Jazz | "Love Is Gone"—David Guetta feat. Chris Willis | Safe |
| François Pruneau | Jive | "Reet Petite"—Jackie Wilson | Eliminated |
| Denitsa Ikonomova | Samba | "Le Serpent"—Guem et Zaka Percussion Ensemble | Bottom 6 |

=== Week 8 (August 29, 2011) ===
Judges: Jean-Marc Généreux, Tré Armstrong, Blake McGrath, Mary Murphy

| Contestants | Style | Music | Choreographer(s) | Result |
| Jordan Clark; Adam LoPapa | Hip-hop | "Say It With Me"—Chris Brown | Luther Brown | LoPapa eliminated |
| Lindsay Leuschner; Shane Simpson | Contemporary | "Uninvited"—Alanis Morissette | Stacey Tookey | Safe |
| Denitsa Ikonomova; Christian Millette | Samba | "Tambourine"—Eve feat. Swizz Beatz | Gustavo Vargas | Ikonomova eliminated |
| Melissa Mitro; Matt Marr | Jazz | "Nobody's Perfect"—Jessie J | Melissa Williams | Safe |
| Top 8 | Jive | "Land of 1,000 Dances"—Union of Sound | Danny Arbour | No result |

- Solos:

| Contestant | Style | Music | Result |
| Melissa Mitro | Contemporary | "Crime for a Crime"—Ani DiFranco | Bottom 4 |
| Matt Marr | Contemporary | "Hold On" (Sub Focus Remix)—Rusko feat. Amber Coffman | Safe |
| Christian Millette | Cha-cha-cha | "Miami 2 Ibiza"—Swedish House Mafia vs. Tinie Tempah | Safe |
| Denitsa Ikonomova | Samba | "Airmail Special" (Club des Belugas remix)—Ella Fitzgerald & Club des Belugas | Eliminated |
| Lindsay Leuschner | Contemporary | "Half Life"—Imogen Heap | Safe |
| Shane Simpson | Jazz | "Hit the Lights"—Jay Sean feat. Lil Wayne | Bottom 4 |
| Jordan Clark | Contemporary | "What Turns You On" (Live)—Katie Thompson | Safe |
| Adam LoPapa | Jazz | "Fire"—Raghav | Eliminated |

=== Week 9 (September 5, 2011) ===
Judges: Jean-Marc Généreux, Tré Armstrong, Blake McGrath, Luther Brown, Mary Murphy

- Group Dances:

- Top 3 Girls: "What About Us"—ATB (Contemporary; Choreographer: Mia Michaels)
- Top 3 Boys: "We Will Rock You"—Queen (Jazz; Choreographer: Melissa Williams)
- Top 6: "Sail"—Awolnation (Contemporary; Choreographer: Sabrina Matthews)

| Contestants | Style | Music | Choreographer(s) | Result |
| Matt Marr; Lindsay Leuschner | Hip-hop | "Like That"—Memphis Bleek | Sho-Tyme | |
| Jordan Clark; Christian Millette | Contemporary | "All in Love Is Fair"—Stevie Wonder | Stacey Tookey | |
| Melissa Mitro; Shane Simpson | Salsa | "Salsa Y Sabor"—Tito Puente | Gustavo Vargas | |

- Solos:

| Contestant | Style | Music | Result |
| Shane Simpson | Jazz | "Fancy Footwork"—Chromeo | |
| Melissa Mitro | Jazz | "Commander"—Kelly Rowland feat. David Guetta | |
| Lindsay Leuschner | Contemporary | "Beautiful"—Me'Shell Ndegeocello | |
| Matt Marr | Contemporary | "Ain't No Sunshine"—Bill Withers | |
| Christian Millette | Cha-cha-cha | "Beautiful People"—Chris Brown feat. Benny Benassi | |
| Jordan Clark | Contemporary | "This Woman's Work"—Greg Laswell | |

== Result shows ==
=== Week 1 (July 12, 2011) ===
- Group dance: Top 22: "On the Floor"—Jennifer Lopez feat. Pitbull (Hip-hop; Choreographer: Luther Brown)
- Solos:

| Contestant | Style | Music | Result |
| Cassandra Flammini | Jazz | "Hello"—Martin Solveig & Dragonette | Eliminated |
| Lauren Lyn | Salsa | "Everything I Can't Have"—Robin Thicke | Safe |
| Geisha Chin | Contemporary | "I'm In Here" (Piano/Vocal version)—Sia | Safe |
| François Pruneau | Jive | "Gotta Keep Moving"—Sue Foley | Safe |
| Rodrigo Basurto | Hip-hop | "Feel It"—Danny Fernandes feat. Shawn Desman | Safe |
| Adam Asselin-Rioux | Contemporary | "A Drop in the Ocean"- Ron Pope | Eliminated |

New partners:

- Geisha Chin
- François Pruneau

=== Week 2 (July 19, 2011) ===
- Group dance: Top 20: "Haddipa"—Pritam & Mika Singh (Bollywood; Choreographer: Longinus Fernandes)
- Solos:

| Contestant | Style | Music | Result |
| Carlena Britch | Hip-hop | "Do It Like a Dude"—Jessie J | Safe |
| Denitsa Ikonomova | Cha-cha-cha | "Let Me Think About It"—Ida Corr vs. Fedde le Grand | Safe |
| Lauren Lyn | Salsa | "Bad Gal"—Savage Skulls & Douster feat. Robyn | Eliminated |
| Dwayne "Boneless" Gulston | Hip-hop | "Yeah 3x"—Chris Brown | Safe |
| JP Dubé | Hip-hop | "Written in the Stars"—Tinie Tempah | Safe |
| Rodrigo Basurto | Hip-hop | "Hit the Lights"—Jay Sean feat. Lil Wayne | Eliminated |

=== Week 3 (July 26, 2011) ===
- Group dance: Top 18: "El Tango de Roxanne"—Ewan McGregor, Jacek Koman & José Feliciano/"No Pregunto Cuantons Son"—Bajofondo (Tango/Musical theatre; Choreographer: Sergio Trujillo)
- Solos:

| Contestant | Style | Music | Result |
| Geisha Chin | Contemporary | "Veins"—Charlotte Martin | Safe |
| Yuliya Zavadska | Jive | "Tutti Frutti"-Little Richard | Safe |
| Teya Wild | Hip-hop | "Party Rock Anthem"—LMFAO feat. Lauren Bennett & GoonRock | Eliminated |
| Adam LoPapa | Jazz | "Dancing Machine" (Polow remix)—The Jackson 5 | Safe |
| François Pruneau | Samba | "Nah Neh Nah"—Rico Bernasconi vs. Vaya Con Dios | Safe |
| Dwayne Gulston | Hip-hop | "Teach Me How to Dougie"—Cali Swag District | Eliminated |

=== Week 4 (August 2, 2011) ===
- Group dance: Top 16: "God is Able"—Smokie Norful (Contemporary; Choreographer: Blake McGrath)
- Solos:

| Contestant | Style | Music | Result |
| Denitsa Ikonomova | Jive | "These Boots Are Made for Walking"—Nancy Sinatra | Safe |
| Jordan Clark | Contemporary | "Gorecki"—Lamb | Safe |
| Shelaina Anderson | Contemporary | "Aha!"—Imogen Heap | Eliminated |
| Joey Arrigo | Contemporary | "The Pieces Don't Fit Anymore"—James Morrison | Safe |
| Shane Simpson | Contemporary | "Come Home"—OneRepublic | Safe |
| Kevin Howe | Contemporary | "Say (All I Need)"—OneRepublic | Eliminated |

=== Week 5 (August 9, 2011) ===
- Group dance: Top 14: " Rumour Has It"—Adele (Jazz; Choreographer: Melissa Williams)
- Solos:

| Contestant | Style | Music | Result |
| Yuliya Zavadska | Samba | "Happy Brasilia"—James Last | Safe |
| Carlena Britch | Hip-hop | "Poison"—Bell Biv DeVoe | Eliminated |
| Geisha Chin | Contemporary | "Let It Rain"—Keri Noble | Safe |
| JP Dubé | Hip-hop | "Raindrops"—Basement Jaxx | Eliminated |
| Shane Simpson | Jazz | "It's Like That"—Run–D.M.C. | Safe |
| Joey Arrigo | Contemporary | "Hallelujah"—Jeff Buckley | Safe |

New partners:

- Yuliya Zavadska
- Shane Simpson

=== Week 6 (August 16, 2011) ===
- Group dance: "Dirty Dancer"—Enrique Iglesias feat. Usher & Lil Wayne (Ballroom; Choreographers: Jean-Marc Généreux and France Mousseau)
- Solos:

| Contestant | Style | Music | Result |
| Lindsay Leuschner | Contemporary | "Hide and Seek"—Imogen Heap | Safe |
| Geisha Chin | Contemporary | "Indestructible (acoustic)"—Robyn | Eliminated |
| Yuliya Zavadska | Jive | "Jump Jive An' Wail"—The Brian Setzer Orchestra | Safe |
| Christian Millette | Cha-cha-cha | "Take Over Control"—Afrojack feat. Eva Simons | Safe |
| Joey Arrigo | Contemporary | "Feelin' Good"—Michael Bublé | Eliminated |
| Shane Simpson | Contemporary | "Stand By Me" | Safe |

=== Week 7 (August 23, 2011) ===
- Group dance: "Heavy in Your Arms"—Florence and the Machine (Contemporary; Choreographer: Sabrina Matthews)
- Solos:

| Contestant | Style | Music | Result |
| Denitsa Ikonomova | Cha-cha-cha | "Born This Way"—Lady Gaga | Safe |
| Yuliya Zavadska | Samba | "Samba Vocalizado (The Vocal Samba)—Luciano Perrone | Eliminated |
| Melissa Mitro | Contemporary | "Swans"—Unkle Bob | Safe |
| Christian Millette | Jive | "Feeling Good"—Colin James | Safe |
| François Pruneau | Cha-cha-cha | "Girls On the Dance Floor"—Far East Movement | Eliminated |
| Adam LoPapa | Contemporary | "Fix the World Up For You"—James Morrison | Safe |

=== Week 8 (August 30, 2011) ===
- Group dance: "Vogue"—Madonna (Jazz; Choreographer: Sean Cheesman)
- Solos:

| Contestant | Style | Music | Result |
| Jordan Clark | Contemporary | "For You I Will"—Drehz | Safe |
| Denitsa Ikonomova | Jive | "Would You...?"—Touch and Go | Eliminated |
| Lindsay Leuschner | Contemporary | "Hurt So Bad"—Kina | Safe |
| Melissa Mitro | Contemporary | "Sort Of"—Ingrid Michaelson | Safe |
| Christian Millette | Samba | "Hip Hip Chin Chin"—Club des Belugas | Safe |
| Adam LoPapa | Jazz | "Lovesick"—Friendly Fires | Eliminated |
| Matt Marr | Tap | "Shambala—Rockapella | Safe |
| Shane Simpson | Contemporary | "Chariot"—Gavin DeGraw | Safe |

=== Week 9 (September 11, 2011) ===
- Judges: Jean-Marc Généreux, Tré Armstrong, Blake McGrath, Mia Michaels, Rex Harrington, Sean Cheesman, Sergio Trujillo, Mary Murphy, Luther Brown
- Group dances:

- Top 22 & Judges: "Showdown"—The Black Eyed Peas (Theatre; Choreographer: Sergio Trujillo)
- Top 20: "Haddipa"—Pritam & Mika Singh (Bollywood; Choreographer: Longinus Fernandes)
- Top 3 girls: "What About Us"—ATB (Contemporary; Choreographer: Mia Michaels)
- Top 22: "On the Floor"—Jennifer Lopez feat. Pitbull (Hip-hop; Choreographer: Luther Brown)
- Top 10: "Marching On" - OneRepublic; (Contemporary/September 11 attacks tribute; Choreographer: Stacey Tookey)
- Top 6: "No Turning Back" (Contemporary; Choreographer: Sean Cheesman)

- Judges' picks:

| Contestants | Style | Music | Choreographer(s) | Chosen by |
| Lindsay Leuschner; Shane Simpson | Disco | "Shake Your Groove Thing"—Peaches & Herb | Melissa Williams | Jean-Marc Généreux |
| Carlena Britch; Dwayne "Boneless" Gulston | Hip-hop | "Super Bass"—Nicki Minaj | Steve Bolton | Luther Brown |
| Jordan Clark; Joey Arrigo | Contemporary | "For the People"—Mark Huculak | Stacey Tookey | Rex Harrington |
| Shelaina Anderson; Matt Marr | Contemporary | "The Nutcracker, Op. 71: Act II Pas De Deux: The Sugar Plum Fairy and Prince Orgead - Tarentella, Dance of the Sugar Plum Fairy—Slovak Radio Symphony Orchestra/Ondrej Lenard "Sofi Needs a Ladder"—Deadmau5 | Sabrina Matthews | Sergio Trujillo |
| Melissa Mitro; Christian Millette | Tango | "La Bohemia"—Electric Dub Tango | Tony Meredith; Melanie LaPatin | Mary Murphy |
| Jordan Clark; Joey Arrigo | Jazz | "That's Life"—Frank Sinatra | Sean Cheesman | Mia Michaels |
| Melissa Mitro; Adam LoPapa | Contemporary | "Set Fire to the Rain"–Adele | Sabrina Matthews | Sean Cheesman |
| Jordan Clark; Christian Millette | Contemporary | "All in Love Is Fair"—Stevie Wonder | Stacey Tookey | Blake McGrath |
| Matt Marr; Lindsay Leuschner | Hip-hop | "Like That"—Memphis Bleek | Sho-Tyme | Tré Armstrong |
| Melissa Mitro; Shane Simpson | Salsa | "Salsa Y Sabor"—Tito Puente | Gustavo Vargas | Mary Murphy |
| Melissa Mitro; Shane Simpson | Hip-hop | "The Time (Dirty Bit)"—The Black Eyed Peas | Luther Brown | Mary Murphy |
| Lindsay Leuschner; Adam LoPapa | Contemporary | "Remember When It Rained"—Josh Groban | Blake McGrath | Luther Brown |
| Denitsa Ikonomova; François Pruneau | Mambo | "Bemba Colora"—Celia Cruz | Gustavo Vargas | Jean-Marc Généreux |
| Lindsey Leuschner; Shane Simpson | Contemporary | "Uninvited"—Alanis Morissette | Stacey Tookey | N/A |
| Melissa Mitro; Matt Marr | Jazz | "Nobody's Perfect"—Jessie J | Melissa Williams | N/A |
| Jordan Clark; Christian Millette | Jazz | "Skin"—Rihanna | Sean Cheesman | N/A |
