= So You Think You Can Dance Canada season 3 =

So You Think You Can Dance Canada
- Season 3
- Hosted by: Leah Miller
- Judges: Jean-Marc Généreux; Tré Armstrong; Blake McGrath; Luther Brown
- Winner: Denys Drozduyk
- Runner-up: Amanda Cleghorn

Release
- Original network: CTV
- Original release: August 15 – October 24, 2010

Season chronology
- ← Previous; Season 2 Next → Season 4

Season 3 of So You Think You Can Dance Canada is a dance reality show and competition that airs on CTV. It is hosted by ETalk correspondent Leah Miller. In addition to the winner receiving the title of Canada's Favourite Dancer and $100,000, both the winner and runner-up received a Mazda 2.

== Auditions ==
Open auditions for this season were held in the following locations, with one guest judge joining Jean-Marc, Tré, and Luther at the Judges' Table:

Audition Venue	City	Date	Guest Judge
Metro Toronto Convention Centre	Toronto, Ontario	November 14, 2009	Mary Murphy
Palais des Congrès, Viger Hall	Montreal, Quebec	November 28, 2009	Mia Michaels
The Centre in Vancouver for Performing Arts	Vancouver, British Columbia	December 5, 2009	Mary Murphy
MacEwan Conference and Event Centre	Calgary, Alberta	March 13, 2010	Stacey Tookey
Bella Rose Arts Centre	Halifax, Nova Scotia	April 21, 2010	Dan Karaty

=== Finals Week ===
Judges: Jean-Marc Généreux, Tré Armstrong, Blake McGrath, Luther Brown, Mary Murphy, Sean Cheesman, France Mousseau, Rex Harrington

Task/style	Music	Choreographer(s)
Hip-Hop	"Drop It Low" - Ester Dean feat. Chris Brown	Luther Brown
Theatre	"Defying Gravity" from Wicked	Sean Cheesman
Jive	"Shut Up!" - Simple Plan	Jean-Marc Généreux and France Mousseau
Group routines	Picked out of a hat	The contestants
Contemporary	"Secrets" - OneRepublic	Blake McGrath
Individual solo	Music chosen by contestant	The contestant

== Contestants ==
=== Elimination chart ===
	Week:	08/24	08/31	09/07	09/14	09/23	09/30	10/07	10/14	10/24
	Contestant	Result								
Top 4	Denys Drozdyuk				Btm 3					WINNER
Top 4	Amanda Cleghorn				Btm 3					Runner-Up
Top 4	Jeffrey Mortensen				Btm 3					3rd Place
Top 4	Janick Arseneau				¸					4th Place
Top 6	Mackenzie Green								Elim	
Top 6	Nathalie Heath					Btm 3	Btm 3	Btm 4	Elim	
Top 8	Sebastian Mersch						Btm 3	Btm 4	Elim	
Top 8	Danielle Gardner					Btm 3			Elim	
Top 10	Edgar Gilbert-Reyes	Btm 3	Btm 3	Btm 3		Btm 3	Btm 3	Elim		
Top 10	Charlene Hartman				Btm 3		Btm 3	Elim		
Top 12	Jonathan Arsenault					Btm 3	Elim			
Top 12	Claudia Primeau		Btm 3	Btm 3			Elim			
Top 14	Shavar Blackwood					Elim				
Top 14	Kloé Schultz					Elim				
Top 16	Jesse Weafer	Btm 3		Btm 3	Elim					
Top 16	Kristen Wicklund		Btm 3	Btm 3	Elim					
Top 16	Jera Wolfe		Btm 3	Elim						
Top 16	Julia Harnett	Btm 3		Elim						
Top 20	Yonni Fournier		Elim							
Top 20	Breanne Wasylenko	Btm 3	Elim							
Top 22	Hani Abaza	Elim								
Top 22	Shelaina Anderson	Elim								

Legend
Female	Male	Bottom 3 couples	Bottom 4 contestants

=== Women ===
Contestant	Age	Home Town	Dance Style	Week Of Elimination
Amanda Cleghorn	19	Mississauga, Ontario	Contemporary	Runner-up
Janick Arseneau	20	Bathurst, New Brunswick	Contemporary	4th Place
Nathalie Heath	23	Surrey, British Columbia	Contemporary	Top 6
Danielle Gardner	21	Surrey, British Columbia	Contemporary	Top 8
Charlene Hartman	24	Abbotsford, British Columbia	Contemporary	Top 10
Claudia Primeau	26	Montreal, Quebec	Ballroom	Top 12
Kloé Schultz	20	North Bay, Ontario	Contemporary	Top 14
Kirsten Wicklund	20	Vancouver, British Columbia	Contemporary	Top 16
Julia Harnett	26	Calgary, Alberta	Latin	Top 18
Bree Wasylenko	22	Toronto, Ontario	Contemporary	Top 20
Shelaina Anderson	19	Edmonton, Alberta	Contemporary	Top 22 (withdrew)

=== Men ===
Contestant	Age	Home Town	Dance Style	Week Of Elimination
Denys Drozdyuk	25	Toronto, Ontario	Ballroom	Winner
Jeff Mortensen	22	Edmonton, Alberta	Contemporary	3rd Place
Mackenzie Green	20	Regina, Saskatchewan	Contemporary	Top 6
Sebastian Mersch	21	Toronto, Ontario	Contemporary	Top 8
Edgar Gilbert-Reyes	22	Calgary, Alberta	Hip Hop	Top 10
Jonathan Arsenault	26	Kitchener, Ontario	Contemporary	Top 12
Shavar Blackwood	25	Toronto, Ontario	Hip Hop	Top 14
Jesse Weafer	25	Inverness, Nova Scotia	Contemporary	Top 16
Jera Wolfe	19	Inverness, Nova Scotia	Ballet/B-Boy	Top 18
Yonni Fournier	27	Montreal, Quebec	Salsa	Top 20
Hani Abaza	25	Ottawa, Ontario	Contemporary	Top 22

== Finals ==
=== Performances ===
==== Week 1 (August 23, 2010) ====
Judges: Jean-Marc Généreux, Tré Armstrong, Blake McGrath, Luther Brown, Mary Murphy

Couples	Style	Music	Choreographer(s)	Result
Claudia Primeau; Yonni Fournier	Salsa	"Calabria 2008"—Enur featuring Natasja Saad	Tony Meredith; Melanie LaPatin	Safe
Kirsten Wicklund; Jera Wolfe	Contemporary	"Fireflies"—Ron Pope	Mandy Moore	Safe
Amanda Cleghorn; Denys Drozdyuk	Tango	"Grand Guginol"—Bajofondo	Tony Meredith; Melanie LaPatin	Safe
Charlene Hart; Jeff Mortensen	Jive	"Celebrity Status"—Marianas Trench	Danny Arbour	Safe
Danielle Gardner; Sebastian Mersch	Bollywood	"Tera Hi Jalwa" from Wanted	Longinus Fernandes	Safe
Kloé Schultz; Jonathan Arsenault	Hip-hop	"X Gon' Give It to Ya"—DMX	Sho-Tyme	Safe
Julia Harnett; Jesse Weafer	New Disco	"The Fame (Glam as You - Radio Edit Remix)"—Lady Gaga	Melissa Williams	Bottom 3
Shavar Blackwood; Janick Arseneau	African Jazz	"Dances with Wood/Baba"—Mickey Hart, Zakir Hussain, Sikiru Adepoju & Giovanni Hidalgo	Sean Cheesman	Safe
Nathalie Heath; Mackenzie Green	Viennese Waltz	"For the Nights I Can't Remember"—Hedley	Pierre Allaire	Safe
Bree Wasylenko; Edgar Gilbert-Reyes	Hip-hop	"OMG"—Usher feat. will.i.am	Jae Blaze	Bottom 3
Tara-Jean Popowich^{1} Hani Abaza	Jazz	"That's How Strong My Love Is"—Otis Redding	Nico Archambault; Wynn Holmes	Anderson withdrew Abaza eliminated

^1 Due to an injury, Shelania Anderson withdrew and was replaced for the evening by the previous season's champion, Tara-Jean Popowich.

==== Week 2 (August 30, 2010) ====
Judges: Jean-Marc Généreux, Tré Armstrong, Luther Brown, Mia Michaels

Couples	Style	Music	Choreographer(s)	Result
Bree Wasylenko; Edgar Gilbert-Reyes	Dancehall	"Clarks"—Vybz Kartel feat. Popcaan and Gaza Smith	Jae Blaze	Wasylenko eliminated
Amanda Cleghorn; Denys Drozdyuk	Contemporary	"Perfect"—Hedley	Sabrina Matthews	Safe
Kirsten Wicklund; Jera Wolfe	Paso Doble	"Iron Night/Mind Control"—Position Music	Natalli Reznik; Francis Lafreniere	Bottom 3
Nathalie Heath; Mackenzie Green	Hip-hop	"All I Do Is Win"—DJ Khaled featuring T-Pain, Ludacris, Snoop Dogg & Rick Ross	Sho-Tyme	Safe
Claudia Primeau; Yonni Fournier	Foxtrot	"Telephone"—Lady Gaga feat. Beyoncé Knowles	Danny Quilliam	Fournier eliminated
Charlene Hart; Jeff Mortensen	Contemporary	"Breathing"—Alisa Turner	Stacey Tookey	Safe
Julia Harnett; Jesse Weafer	Samba	"Cuban Pete"—iSweat Music	Tony Meredith; Melanie LaPatin	Safe
Danielle Gardner; Sebastian Mersch	Theater	"No Good Deed"—Idina Menzel	Sean Cheesman	Safe
Shavar Blackwood; Janick Arseneau	Krumping	"Whatever" – Buckmouth	Lil' C	Safe
Kloé Schultz; Jonathan Arsenault	Jazz	"California Gurls"—Katy Perry ft. Snoop Dogg	Blake McGrath	Safe

==== Week 3 (September 6, 2010) ====
Judges: Jean-Marc Généreux, Tré Armstrong, Blake McGrath, Melissa Williams

Couples	Style	Music	Choreographer(s)	Result
Amanda Cleghorn; Denys Drozdyuk	Quickstep	"Feelin' Good"—Colin James	Tony Meredith; Melanie LaPatin	Safe
Shavar Blackwood; Janick Arseneau	Hip-hop	"Lil Freak"—Usher feat. Nicki Minaj	Luther Brown	Safe
Julia Harnett; Jesse Weafer	Contemporary	"Falling"—Florence and the Machine	Stacey Tookey	Harnett eliminated
Charlene Hart; Jeff Mortensen	Hustle	"That's Where the Happy People Go"—The Trammps	Maria Torres	Safe
Nathalie Heath; Mackenzie Green	Cha-cha-cha	"I Like It"—Enrique Iglesias feat. Pitbull	Gustavo Vargas	Safe
Danielle Gardner; Sebastian Mersch	Contemporary	"Gunnin'"—Hedley	Sabrina Matthews	Safe
Kirsten Wicklund; Jera Wolfe	Hip-hop	"Now That We Found Love"—Heavy D	Sho-Tyme	Wolfe eliminated
Claudia Primeau; Edgar Gilbert-Reyes	Lyrical jazz	"Impossible"—Shontelle	Sean Cheesman	Bottom 3
Kloé Schultz; Jonathan Arsenault	West Coast Swing	"Clocks"—The Vitamin String Quartet	Benji Schwimmer	Safe

==== Week 4 (September 13, 2010) ====
Judges: Jean-Marc Généreux, Tré Armstrong, Rex Harrington, Stacey Tookey

Couples	Style	Music	Choreographer(s)	Result
Claudia Primeau; Edgar Gilbert-Reyes	Mambo	"La Reina"—La Lupe	Gustavo Vargas	Safe
Nathalie Heath; Mackenzie Green	Contemporary	"After Afterall"—William Fitzsimmons	Blake McGrath	Safe
Amanda Cleghorn; Denys Drozdyuk	House	"Hey Hey"—Dennis Ferrer	Sho-Tyme	Bottom 3
Charlene Hart; Jeff Mortensen	Jazz	"Desnudate"—Christina Aguilera	Sean Cheesman	Bottom 3
Shavar Blackwood; Janick Arseneau	Contemporary	"Ordinary Moment"—Fisher	Mandy Moore	Safe
Danielle Gardner; Sebastian Mersch	Hip-hop	"Hard"—Rihanna feat. Young Jeezy	Luther Brown	Safe
Kirsten Wicklund; Jesse Weafer	Rumba	"Always"—Bon Jovi	Eric Caty; Kelly Lannan	Both eliminated
Kloé Schultz; Jonathan Arsenault	New Disco	"If I Had You"—Adam Lambert	Melissa Williams	Safe

==== Week 5 (September 22, 2010) ====
Judges: Jean-Marc Généreux, Tré Armstrong, Mia Michaels, Sean Cheesman

- Beginning at week 5, the contestants select another pair to dance with.

Couples	Style	Music	Choreographer(s)	Result
Charlene Hart; Mackenzie Green	Jive	"Magic"—B.o.B feat. Rivers Cuomo	Danny Arbour	Safe
Amanda Cleghorn; Sebastien Mersch	Contemporary	"Hyperballad"—Whitley	Stacey Tookey	Safe
Claudia Primeau; Denys Drozdyuk	Samba/Capoeira	"Que Colsa Louca"—Samba Squad	Gustavo Vargas	Safe
Kloé Schultz; Shavar Blackwood	Theater	"Your Song"—Elton John	Melissa Williams	Both Eliminated
Janick Arseneau; Jeff Mortensen	Hip-hop	"Gangsta Luv"—Snoop Dogg feat. The-Dream	Luther Brown	Safe
Danielle Gardner; Edgar Gilbert-Reyes	Contemporary	"Whataya Want From Me"—Adam Lambert	Sabrina Matthews	Bottom 3
Nathalie Heath; Jonathan Arsenault	Jazz	"Teenage Dream"—Katy Perry	Blake McGrath	Bottom 3

==== Week 6 (September 29, 2010) ====
Judges: Jean-Marc Généreux, Tré Armstrong, Blake McGrath, Luther Brown, Mary Murphy

Contestants	Style	Music	Choreographer(s)	Result
Janick Arseneau; Denys Drozdyuk	Paso Doble	"España cañí"—Manhattan Pops Orchestra	Natalli Reznik; Francis Lafreniere	Safe
Danielle Gardner; Jeff Mortensen	Contemporary	"Elephant in the Room"—Richard Walters	Stacey Tookey	Safe
Charlene Hart; Edgar Gilbert-Reyes	Salsa	"La Voz del Caribe"—Eddie Palmieri	Gustavo Vargas	Bottom 3
Amanda Cleghorn; Mackenzie Green	African jazz	"Drumming Circle"—Professor Trance & the Energizers	Sean Cheesman	Safe
Claudia Primeau; Jonathan Arsenault	Hip-hop	"The One"—Mary J. Blige feat. Drake	Sho-Tyme	Both eliminated
Nathalie Heath; Sebastian Mersch	Disco	"You Should Be Dancing"—Bee Gees	Maria Torres	Bottom 3

==== Week 7 (October 6, 2010) ====
Judges: Jean-Marc Généreux, Tré Armstrong, Dan Karaty, Karen Kain

Contestants	Style	Music	Choreographer(s)	Result
Amanda Cleghorn; Edgar Gilbert-Reyes	Hip-hop	"Find Your Love"—Drake	Luther Brown	Gilbert-Reyes eliminated
Nathalie Heath; Denys Drozdyuk	Mambo	"Mambo de Bataan"—Joe Bataan	Gustavo Vargas	Heath in bottom 4
Charlene Hart; Mackenzie Green	Contemporary	"One Day Like This"—Elbow	Stacey Tookey	Hart eliminated
Janick Arseneau; Jeff Mortensen	Jazz-Funk	"Come On Girl"—Taio Cruz ft. Luciana	Blake McGrath	Safe
Danielle Gardner; Sebastian Mersch	Quickstep	"Back in Town"—Matt Dusk	Pierre Allaire	Mersch in bottom 4

- Top 10 contestant's solos:

Contestants	Style	Music	Result
Sebastian Mersch	Contemporary	"99 Luftballoons"—Goldfinger	Bottom 4
Danielle Gardner	Contemporary	"Stupid" (Mark Bell mix)—Sarah McLachlan	Safe
Jeff Mortensen	Ukrainian folk dance	"Bukovynian Rhythm"—Ukrainian Shumka Dancers	Safe
Janick Arsenau	Contemporary	"Gotta Get Thru This (Acoustic version)"—Daniel Bedingfield	Safe
Edgar Gilbert-Reyes	Hip-hop	"She Don't Know"—Usher feat. Ludacris	Eliminated
Amanda Cleghorn	Contemporary	"Love"—Anouk	Safe
Mackenzie Green	Contemporary	"In My Place"—Coldplay	Safe
Charlene Hart	Contemporary	"Machine Gun"—Portishead	Eliminated
Denys Drozdyuk	Ballroom	"Balao Destemperado"—Barbatuques	Safe
Nathalie Heath	Contemporary	"Gravity"—Sara Bareilles	Bottom 4

==== Week 8 (October 13, 2010) ====
- Group dance: "History Repeating"—Propellerheads feat. Shirley Bassey (Jazz; Choreographer: Sean Cheesman)

Judges: Jean-Marc Généreux, Tré Armstrong, Sergio Trujillo, Rex Harrington

Couples	Style	Music	Choreographer(s)	Result
Janick Arsenau; Mackenzie Green	Hip-hop	"Put Your Hands Where My Eyes Could See"—Busta Rhymes	Luther Brown	Green eliminated
Danielle Gardner; Denys Drozdyuk	Contemporary	"Highway of Heroes"—The Trews	Sabrina Matthews	Gardner eliminated
Amanda Cleghorn; Jeff Mortensen	Contemporary	"Dancing"—Elisa	Stacey Tookey	Safe
Nathalie Heath; Sebastian Mersch	Cha-cha-cha	"Only Girl (In the World)"—Rihanna	Danny Arbour	Both eliminated

- Top 8 contestant's solos:

Dancer	Style	Music	Result
Jeff Mortensen	Contemporary	"15 Step"—Radiohead	Safe
Nathalie Heath	Contemporary	"Butterflyz"—Alicia Keys	Eliminated
Amanda Cleghorn	Jazz	"Moan" (Trentemøller Remix)—Trentemøller	Safe
Sebastian Mersch	Contemporary	"Your Ex-Lover Is Dead"—Stars	Eliminated
Denys Drozdyuk	Ballroom	"Kaboom"—Ursula 1000	Safe
Janick Arseneau	Contemporary	"Myphilosophy"—Inner	Safe
Danielle Gardner	Contemporary	"Bloodstone"—Amon Tobin	Eliminated
Mackenzie Green	Contemporary	"Ghosts 'n' Stuff"—Deadmau5 feat. Rob Swire	Eliminated

==== Week 9 (October 20, 2010) ====
- Group dance: "Undone" (With the Hagerman Quartet)"—DeVotchKa (Contemporary; Choreographer: Stacey Tookey)

Couples	Style	Music	Choreographer(s)
Amanda Cleghorn; Denys Drozdyuk	Salsa	"I Love Salsa"—N'Klabe	Gustavo Vargas
Janick Arseneau; Denys Drozdyuk	Contemporary	"Salvation"—Scanners	Nico Archambault; Wynn Holmes
Janick Arseneau; Jeff Mortensen	Jazz-fusion	"Veins"—Charlotte Martin	Sean Cheesman
Amanda Cleghorn; Jeff Mortensen	Contemporary	"Nowhere to Stand"—k.d. lang	Sabrina Matthews

- Top 4 contestant's solos:

Contestants	Style	Music
Jeff Mortensen	Hopak	"Shumka's 50th Anniversary Hopak"—Ukrainian Shumka Dancers
Amanda Cleghorn	Contemporary	"No More I Love You's"—Annie Lennox
Denys Drozdyuk	Paso Doble	"España cañí"—Manhattan Pops Orchestra
Janick Arseneau	Jazz	"Bang Bang"—Melanie Fiona

=== Result shows ===
==== Week 1 (August 24, 2010) ====
- Group dance: Top 21: "Zombie" from Fela! (Theater; Choreographer: Bill T. Jones)
- Solos:

Contestants	Style	Music	Result
Hani Abaza	Jazz	"Audacity of Huge"—Simian Mobile Disco	Eliminated
Edgar Gilbert-Reyes	Hip-hop	"Girls on the Dancefloor"—Far East Movement	Safe
Jesse Weafer	Contemporary	"It's Gonna Be a Long Walk" - Apparat	Safe
Shelaina Anderson	N/A		Withdrew
Bree Wasylenko	Contemporary	"The Dance"—Charlotte Martin	Safe
Julia Harnett	Jive	"T-R-O-U-B-L-E"—Travis Tritt	Safe

- New pairs:

- None

==== Week 2 (August 31, 2010) ====
- Group dance: Top 20: "Jai Ho" from Slumdog Millionaire (Bollywood; Choreographer: Longinus Fernandes)
- Solos:

Contestants	Style	Music	Result
Claudia Primeau	Latin	"Alors on danse"—Stromae	Safe
Kirsten Wicklund	Contemporary	"I Don't Feel It Anymore (Song of the Sparrow)"—William Fitzsimmons	Safe
Bree Wasylenko	Contemporary	"What Sound"—Lamb	Eliminated
Yonni Fournier	Salsa	"Echa Pa' Lante"—Thalía	Eliminated
Jera Wolfe	Ballet/B-boying	"If I Ever Feel Better"—Phoenix	Safe
Edgar Gilbert-Reyes	Hip-hop	"All Night Long"—Robin Thicke feat. Lil Wayne	Safe

- New pairs:

- Claudia Primeau
- Edgar Gilbert-Reyes

==== Week 3 (September 7, 2010) ====
- Group dance: Top 18: "Let Go"—Mitzi Gaynor (Jazz; Choreographer: Mia Michaels)
- Solos:

Contestants	Style	Music	Result
Kirsten Wicklund	Contemporary	"The Gulag Orkestar"—Beirut	Safe
Claudia Primeau	Cha-cha-cha	"When I Grow Up"—Pussycat Dolls	Safe
Julia Harnett	Cha-cha-cha	"Perhaps"—Sunray feat. Kym Mazelle	Eliminated
Jera Wolfe	Contemporary	"Hey"—Pixies	Eliminated
Edgar Gilbert-Reyes	Hip-Hop	"Nobody"—Ne-Yo	Safe
Jesse Weafer	Contemporary	"Squander"—Skunk Anansie	Safe

- New Pairs:

- Kirsten Wicklund
- Jesse Weafer

==== Week 4 (September 14, 2010) ====
- Group dance: Top 16: "Sing Sing Sing Part 1 (81neutronz and Sergio Trujillo remix)—Louis Prima (Theater; Choreographer: Sergio Trujillo)
- Solos:

Contestants	Style	Music	Result
Amanda Cleghorn	Contemporary	"You Run Away"—Barenaked Ladies	Safe
Charlene Hart	Contemporary	"Drumming Song"—Florence and the Machine	Safe
Kirsten Wicklund	Contemporary	"Tonight"—Lykke Li	Eliminated
Denys Drozdyuk	Jive	"Proud Mary"—Ike & Tina Turner	Safe
Jeff Mortensen	Contemporary	"Aha!"—Imogen Heap	Safe
Jesse Weafer	Contemporary	"That Home"—The Cinematic Orchestra	Eliminated

- New pairs:

- None

==== Week 5 (September 23, 2010) ====
- Group dance: Top 14: "Hello Good Morning"— Diddy-Dirty Money (Hip-hop; Choreographer: Luther Brown)
- Solos:

Contestants	Style	Music	Result
Nathalie Heath	Jazz	"Stylin"—Lisa Shaw	Safe
Kloé Schultz	Jazz	"Hater"—various	Eliminated
Danielle Gardner	Contemporary	"Swans"—Unkle Bob	Safe
Jonathan Arsenault	Contemporary	"The Scientist"—Coldplay	Safe
Shavar Blackwood	Hip-hop	"Music for Love"—Mario	Eliminated
Edgar Gilbert-Reyes	Hip-hop	"So Dope"—New Boyz	Safe

==== Week 6 (September 30, 2010) ====
- Group dance: Top 12: "Will I?" from Rent (Contemporary; Choreographer: Mia Michaels)
- Solos:

Contestants	Style	Music	Result
Charlene Hart	Contemporary	"In or Out"—Ani DiFranco	Safe
Natalie Heath	Contemporary	"Dear Los Angeles"—Sam Behymer	Safe
Claudia Primeau	Jive	"Reet Petite"—Jackie Wilson	Eliminated
Edgar Gilbert-Reyes	Hip-hop	"Boom Boom Pow"—The Black Eyed Peas	Safe
Sebastian Mersch	Contemporary	"Off the Rails"—The Notwist	Safe
Jonathan Arsenault	Contemporary	"Cyclone"—Baby Bash	Eliminated

==== Week 7 (October 7, 2010) ====
- Group dance: Top 10: "Troglodyte (Cave Man)"—Jimmy Castor Bunch/"Disco Inferno"—The Trammps (Disco; Choreographer: Maria Torres)
- Top 10 contestants' solos:

Contestants	Style	Music	Result
Nathalie Heath	Contemporary	"I'd Do It All Again"—Corinne Bailey Rae	Safe
Charlene Hart	Contemporary	"I Dare You"—Ali Milner	Eliminated
Edgar Gilbert-Reyes	Hip-hop	"I Get It In"—Omarion feat. Gucci Mane	Eliminated
Sebastian Mersch	Contemporary	"To Build a Home"—The Cinematic Orchestra	Safe

==== Week 8 (October 14, 2010) ====
- Group dance: Top 8: "Take It Off"—Kesha (Cha-cha-cha; Choreographers: Jean-Marc Généreux and France Mousseau)
- Solos:

Contestant	Style	Music	Result
Danielle Gardner	Contemporary	"This Woman's Work"—Kate Bush	Eliminated
Amanda Cleghorn	Contemporary	"Summertime"—Kat Edmonson	Safe
Nathalie Heath	Contemporary	"Possession"—Sarah McLachlan	Eliminated
Janick Arsenau	Contemporary	"Again Again"—Lady Gaga	Safe
Jeff Mortensen	Contemporary	"Force"—Tanya Tagaq	Safe
Sebastian Mersch	Jazz	"Cooler Than Me"—Mike Posner	Eliminated
Denys Drozdyuk	Ballroom	"We Will Rock You"—Queen	Safe
Mackenzie Green	Jazz		Eliminated

==== Week 9 (October 24, 2010) ====
Judges: Jean-Marc Généreux, Tré Armstrong, Blake McGrath, Luther Brown, Sergio Trujillo, Rex Harrington, Mary Murphy, Mia Michaels

- Group Dances:

- Top 21: "Flashdance What A Feeling"—DJ. BoBo ft. Irene Cara(Theatre; Choreographer: Sergio Trujillo)
- Top 21: "Zombie" from Fela! (Theatre; Choreographer: Bill T. Jones)
- Top 12: "Will I?" from Rent (Contemporary; Choreographer: Mia Michaels)
- Top 10: "Under Pressure"—Queen (Jazz; Choreographer: Melissa Williams)
- Top 4: "Relax"—Blake McGrath (Jazz; Choreographer: Mia Michaels)

- Special Performance:
  - Justin Jackson: "Knockin"—Ledisi
- Judges' Picks

Couple	Style	Music	Choreographer	Chosen by
Amanda Cleghorn; Denys Drozduyk	Salsa	"I Love Salsa"—N'Klabe	Gustavo Vargas	Jean-Marc Genereux
Nathalie Heath; Mackenzie Green	Hip-hop	"All I Do Is Win"—DJ Khaled featuring T-Pain, Ludacris, Snoop Dogg & Rick Ross	Sho-Tyme	Luther Brown
Kirsten Wicklund; Jera Wolfe	Contemporary	"Fireflies"—Ron Pope	Mandy Moore	Rex Harrington
Janick Arseneau; Shavar Blackwood	African Jazz	"Dances with Wood/Baba"—Mickey Hart, Zakir Hussain, Sikiru Adepoju & Giovanni Hidalgo	Sean Cheesman	N/A
Charlene Hart; Jeff Mortensen	Hustle	"That's Where the Happy People Go"—The Trammps	Maria Torres	Blake McGrath
Danielle Gardner; Sebastian Mersch	Theatre	"No Good Deed"—Idina Menzel	Sean Cheesman	Mia Michaels
Nathalie Heath; Mackenzie Green	Contemporary	"After Afterall"—William Fitzsimmons	Blake McGrath	Leah Miller
Amanda Cleghorn; Jeff Mortensen	Contemporary	"Nowhere to Stand"—k.d. lang	Sabrina Matthews	N/A
Janick Arsenau; Mackenzie Green	Hip-hop	"Put Your Hands Where My Eyes Could See"—Busta Rhymes	Luther Brown	Tré Armstrong
Claudia Primeau; Edgar Gilbert-Reyes	Mambo	"La Reina"—La Lupe	Gustavo Vargas	Jean-Marc Généreux
Danielle Gardner; Denys Drozdyuk	Contemporary	"Highway of Heroes"—The Trews	Sabrina Matthews	Sergio Trujillo
Amanda Cleghorn; Denys Drozdyuk	Tango	"Grand Guginol"—Bajofondo	Tony Meredith; Melanie LaPatin	Tré Armstrong
Amanda Cleghorn; Jeff Mortensen	Contemporary	"Dancing"—Elisa	Stacey Tookey	N/A
Janick Arseneau; Denys Drozdyuk	Paso Doble	"España cañí"—Manhattan Pops Orchestra	Natalli Reznik; Francis Lafreniere	N/A

- Eliminated:

- Janick Arseneau
- Jeff Mortensen

- Runner-up:

- Amanda Cleghorn

- WINNER:

- Denys Drozduyk
