= So You Think You Can Dance Canada season 1 =

So You Think You Can Dance Canada
- Season 1
- Hosted by: Leah Miller
- Judges: Jean-Marc Généreux; Tré Armstrong; Blake McGrath; Luther Brown
- Winner: Nicolas Archambault
- Runner-up: Allie Bertram

Release
- Original network: CTV
- Original release: September 11 – December 7, 2008

Season chronology
- Next → Season 2

Season 1 of So You Think You Can Dance Canada is a dance reality show and competition that airs on CTV. It is hosted by MuchMusic VJ Leah Miller.

The series is based on the original American TV series So You Think You Can Dance. Auditions started April 7, 2008 in Vancouver, British Columbia and ended in Toronto, Ontario on June 8, 2008. The show premiered on September 11, 2008 beginning with the Toronto auditions. The first winner was Nicholas Archambault, with Allie Bertram coming in the runner-up position.

== Auditions ==
Open auditions for this season were held in the following locations:

- April 7 – Vancouver, British Columbia – The Centre in Vancouver for Performing Arts
- May 5 – Halifax, Nova Scotia – Cunard Centre
- May 12 – Calgary, Alberta – MacEwan Conference & Event Centre
- May 27 – Montreal, Quebec – Theatre Saint-Denis – 700 auditioned
- June 8 – Toronto, Ontario – Metro Toronto Convention Centre – approx. 1000 auditioned

== Top 20 contestants ==
=== Women ===
| Contestant | Age | Home town | Dance style | Week of elimination |
|---|---|---|---|---|
| Allie Bertram | 18 | Calgary, Alberta | Ballet | Runner-up |
| Natalli Reznik | 21 | Toronto, Ontario | Latin | 4th place |
| Lisa Auguste | 27 | Toronto, Ontario | Contemporary | Top 6 |
| Arassay Reyes | 21 | Surrey, British Columbia | Contemporary | Top 8 |
| Kaitlyn Fitzgerald | 18 | Loretto, Ontario | Contemporary | Top 10 |
| Laura Smythe | 25 | Toronto, Ontario | Contemporary | Top 12 |
| Caroline Torti | 23 | Oakville, Ontario | Contemporary | Top 14 |
| Tamina Pollack-Paris | 19 | Toronto, Ontario | Hip hop | Top 16 |
| Romina D'Ugo | 22 | Toronto, Ontario | Salsa | Top 18 |
| Breanne Wong | 25 | Whitby, Ontario | Contemporary | Top 20 |

=== Men ===
| Contestant | Age | Home town | Dance style | Week of elimination |
|---|---|---|---|---|
| Nicolas Archambault | 23 | Montreal, Quebec | Contemporary | Winner |
| Miles Faber | 21 | Calgary, Alberta | Hip hop | 3rd place |
| Izaak Smith | 19 | Prince George, British Columbia | Contemporary | Top 6 |
| Vincent Noiseux | 22 | Montreal, Quebec | Contemporary | Top 8 |
| Danny Arbour | 26 | Montreal, Quebec | Ballroom | Top 10 |
| Francis Lafrenière | 28 | Saint-Bruno-de-Montarville, Quebec | Ballroom | Top 12 |
| Jesse Catibog | 29 | Toronto, Ontario | Hip hop | Top 14 |
| Joey Matt | 19 | Calgary, Alberta | Contemporary | Top 16 |
| Dario Milard | 19 | Saint-Hubert, Quebec | Contemporary | Top 18 |
| Kevin Mylrea | 22 | Westbank, British Columbia | Contemporary | Top 20 |

=== Elimination chart ===
Legend
| Female | Male | Bottom 3 couples | Bottom 4 contestants |

| | Week: | 10/09 | 10/16 | 10/23 | 10/30 | 11/06 | 11/13 | 11/20 | 11/27 | 12/04 |
| | Contestant | Result | | | | | | | | |
| Top 4 | Nicholas Archambault | | | | | | | | | WINNER |
| Top 4 | Allie Bertram | | | | | Btm 3 | | | | Runner-Up |
| Top 4 | Miles Faber | | | | Btm 3 | Btm 3 | Btm 4 | | | 3rd place |
| Top 4 | Natalli Reznik | Btm 3 | | Btm 3 | | Btm 3 | Btm 4 | | | 4th place |
| Top 6 | Izaak Smith | | | Btm 3 | | | | Btm 4 | Elim | |
| Top 6 | Lisa Auguste | | Btm 3 | | Btm 3 | | | Btm 4 | Elim | |
| Top 8 | Vincent-Olivier Noiseux | | Btm 3 | | Btm 3 | | | Elim | | |
| Top 8 | Arassay Reyes | | | | | | | Elim | | |
| Top 10 | Danny Arbour | | | | | Btm 3 | Elim | | | |
| Top 10 | Kaitlyn Fitzgerald | | | Btm 3 | | | Elim | | | |
| Top 12 | Francis Lafrenière | Btm 3 | | Btm 3 | | Elim | | | | |
| Top 12 | Laura Smythe | | | | Btm 3 | Elim | | | | |
| Top 14 | Jesse Catibog | | Btm 3 | | Elim | | | | | |
| Top 14 | Caroline Torti | | Btm 3 | | Elim | | | | | |
| Top 16 | Joey Matt | | | Elim | | | | | | |
| Top 16 | Tamina Pollack-Paris | | | Elim | | | | | | |
| Top 18 | Dario Milard | Btm 3 | Elim | | | | | | | |
| Top 18 | Romina D'Ugo | Btm 3 | Elim | | | | | | | |
| Top 20 | Kevin Mylrea | Elim | | | | | | | | |
| Top 20 | Breanne Wong | Elim | | | | | | | | |

=== Performances ===
==== Week 1 (October 8, 2008) ====
Judges: Jean-Marc Généreux, Tré Armstrong, Blake McGrath, Luther Brown

| Couple | Style | Music | Choreographer | Results |
|---|---|---|---|---|
| Nico Archambault; Arassay Reyes | Salsa | "La Salsa la Traigo Yo" – Sonora Carruseles | Gustavo Vargas | Safe |
| Kevin Mylrea; Natalli Reznik | Hip-hop | "The Way I Are" – Timbaland feat. Keri Hilson & D.O.E. | Tanisha Scott | Mylrea eliminated |
| Francis Lafrenière; Breanne Wong | Smooth waltz | "(You Make Me Feel Like) A Natural Woman" – Aretha Franklin | Amy Wright | Wong eliminated |
| Danny Arbour; Allie Bertram | Jive | "Rock This Town" – Stray Cats | Melissa Williams | Safe |
| Izaak Smith; Kaitlyn Fitzgerald | Broadway | "All That Jazz" from Chicago | Sean Cheesman | Safe |
| Vincent Noiseux; Lisa Auguste | Contemporary | "Slow Me Down" – Emmy Rossum | Stacey Tookey | Safe |
| Miles Faber; Lara Smythe | Disco | "Shake It" – Metro Station | Melissa Williams | Safe |
| Dario Milard; Romina D'Ugo | Hip-hop | "Dangerous" – Kardinal Offishall feat. Akon | Tanisha Scott | Bottom 3 |
| Joey Matt; Tamina Pollack-Paris | Tango | "Santa Maria (Del Buen Ayre)" – Gotan Project | Gustavo Vargas | Safe |
| Jesse Catibog; Caroline Torti | Jazz | "Soul Man" – Sam & Dave | Clarence Ford | Safe |

==== Week 2 (October 15, 2008) ====
Judges: Jean-Marc Généreux, Tré Armstrong, Blake McGrath, Luther Brown

| Couple | Style | Music | Choreographer | Results |
|---|---|---|---|---|
| Danny Arbour; Allie Bertram | Mambo | "Mambo Gozon" – Tito Puente | Tony Meredith; Melanie LaPatin | Safe |
| Vincent Noiseux; Lisa Auguste | Hip-hop | "Anti-Matter" – N.E.R.D. | Jae Blaze | Bottom 3 |
| Nico Archambault; Arassay Reyes | Lyrical jazz | "Somebody to Love" – Queen | Melissa Williams | Safe |
| Francis Lafrenière; Natalli Reznik | Paso Doble | "Espana Cani" – Manhattan Pops Orchestra | Tony Meredith; Melanie LaPatin | Safe |
| Izaak Smith; Kaitlyn Fitzgerald | Dancehall | "Click Mi Finger" – Erup | Jae Blaze | Safe |
| Miles Faber; Lara Smythe | Viennese waltz | "At Last" – Etta James | Amy Wright | Safe |
| Jesse Catibog; Caroline Torti | Hip-hop | "Touch It" – Busta Rhymes | Tanisha Scott | Bottom 3 |
| Joey Matt; Tamina Pollack-Pari | Contemporary | "Crocodile Rock" – Elton John | Paul Becker | Safe |
| Dario Milard; Romina D'Ugo | Jazz-pop | "Disturbia" – Rihanna | Sean Cheesman | Both eliminated |

==== Week 3 (October 22, 2008) ====
Judges: Jean-Marc Généreux, Tré Armstrong, Paul Becker, Kenny Ortega

| Couple | Style | Music | Choreographer | Results |
|---|---|---|---|---|
| Miles Faber; Lara Smythe | Krump | "Tiny Ram Anthem" – Tha J-Squad | Lil' C | Safe |
| Izaak Smith; Kaitlyn Fitzgerald | Cha-Cha | "Make Me Sweat" – Basement Jaxx | Benji Schwimmer | Bottom 3 |
| Vincent Noiseux; Lisa Auguste | African jazz | "Hlohonolofatsa" – Soweto Gospel Choir | Sean Cheesman | Safe |
| Joey Matt; Tamina Pollack-Paris | Hip-hop | "Ditch That..." – The-Dream | Luther Brown | Both eliminated |
| Francis Lafrenière; Natalli Reznik | Rumba | "Perfidia" – New 101 Strings Orchestra | Gustavo Vargas | Bottom 3 |
| Danny Arbour; Allie Bertram | Quickstep | "The Boogie Bumper" – Casa musica Sound Studios Düsseldorf | Pierre Allaire | Safe |
| Nico Archambault; Arassay Reyes | Contemporary | Let Me Leave – Marc Broussard | Blake McGrath | Safe |
| Jesse Catibog; Caroline Torti | Rock and roll | "Miss Murder" – AFI | Melissa Williams | Safe |

==== Week 4 (October 29, 2008) ====
Judges: Jean-Marc Généreux, Tré Armstrong, Rex Harrington, Mary Murphy

| Couple | Style | Music | Choreographer | Results |
|---|---|---|---|---|
| Vincent Noiseux; Lisa Auguste | Samba | "Skip to the Bip" – Club des Belugas feat. Brenda Boykin | Dmitry Chaplin | Bottom 3 |
| Miles Faber; Lara Smythe | Swing | "Livin' for the Weekend" – The O'Jays | Benji Schwimmer | Bottom 3 |
| Nico Archambault; Arassay Reyes | Hip-hop | "Don't Touch Me (Throw da Water on 'em)" – Busta Rhymes | Luther Brown | Safe |
| Danny Arbour; Allie Bertram | Contemporary | "Someday" – John Legend | Paul Becker | Safe |
| Francis Lafrenière; Natalli Reznik | Broadway | "Cell Block Tango" – Countdown Singers | Sean Cheesman | Safe |
| Jesse Catibog; Caroline Torti | Hustle | "Womanizer" – Britney Spears | Benji Schwimmer | Both eliminated |
| Izaak Smith; Kaitlyn Fitzgerald | Jazz-pop | "Breakin' Dishes" – Rihanna | Blake McGrath | Safe |

==== Week 5 (November 5, 2008) ====
Judges: Jean-Marc Généreux, Tré Armstrong, Melissa Williams, Rex Harrington

| Couple | Style | Music | Choreographer | Results |
|---|---|---|---|---|
| Francis Lafrenière; Natalli Reznik | Salsa | "Hasta Que Se Rompa el Cuero" – Sonora Carruseles | Gustavo Vargas | Lafrenière eliminated |
| Danny Arbour; Allie Bertram | Hip-hop | "In the Ayer" – Flo Rida feat. will.i.am | Luther Brown | Bottom 3 |
| Miles Faber; Lara Smythe | Foxtrot | "Summer Wind" – Michael Bublé | Danny Quilliam | Smythe eliminated |
| Izaak Smith; Kaitlyn Fitzgerald | Jive | Untouched – The Veronicas | Dmitry Chaplin | Safe |
| Nico Archambault; Arassay Reyes | Jazz | It's a Man's Man's Man's World – James Brown | Paul Becker | Safe |
| Vincent Noiseux; Lisa Auguste | House (dance) | 100% Pure Love – Crystal Waters | Sho-Tyme | Safe |

==== Week 6 (November 12, 2008) ====
Judges: Jean-Marc Généreux, Tré Armstrong, Blake McGrath, Luther Brown

| Couple | Style | Music | Choreographer | Results |
|---|---|---|---|---|
| Izaak Smith; Natalli Reznik | Hip-hop | "Mama Said Knock You Out" – LL Cool J | Sho-Tyme | Reznik in bottom 4 |
| Danny Arbour; Kaitlyn Fitzgerald | Mambo | "Salsa y Sibor" – Tito Puente | Tony Meredith; Melanie LaPatin | Both eliminated |
| Nico Archambault; Allie Bertram | Viennese waltz | "That's Life" – Michael Bublé | Amy Wright | Safe |
| Vincent Noiseux; Arassay Reyes | Disco | "Hot n Cold" – Katy Perry | Melissa Williams | Safe |
| Miles Faber; Lisa Auguste | Contemporary | "Soulmate" – Natasha Bedingfield | Sean Cheesman | Faber in bottom 4 |

- Top 10 contestants' solos:

| Contestant | Style | Music | Result |
| Vincent Noiseux | Contemporary | "Pour Gabrielle"–Jorane | Safe |
| Arassay Reyes | Jazz | "Eyes on Me" – Celine Dion | Safe |
| Lisa Auguste | Contemporary | "Secret" – Missy Higgins | Safe |
| Miles Faber | Popping | "Juice (Know the Ledge)" – Eric B. & Rakim | Bottom 4 |
| Danny Arbour | Cha-cha-cha | "Closer" – Ne-Yo | Eliminated |
| Kaitlyn Fitzgerald | Contemporary | "Best for Last" – Adele | Eliminated |
| Allie Bertram | Ballet | "Fun for Me" – Moloko | Safe |
| Nico Archambault | Contemporary | "Halo" – The Pinup Saints | Safe |
| Natalli Reznik | Salsa | "Quimbara" – Celia Cruz | Bottom 4 |
| Izaak Smith | Contemporary | "No One" – Alicia Keys | Safe |

==== Week 7 (November 19, 2008) ====
Judges: Jean-Marc Généreux, Tré Armstrong, Dan Karaty, Mia Michaels

| Couple | Style | Music | Choreographer | Results |
|---|---|---|---|---|
| Miles Faber; Allie Bertram | Samba | "Aguanile" – Hector Lavoe | Eric Caty | Safe |
| Miles Faber; Allie Bertram | African jazz | "Shosholoza" – Soweto Gospel Choir | Vicky Lambert | Safe |
| Isaak Smith; Arassay Reyes | Lindy Hop | "Welcome to the Black Parade" – My Chemical Romance | Benji Schwimmer | Smith in bottom 4 Reyes eliminated |
| Isaak Smith; Arassay Reyes | Tango | "Pa' Bailar (Instrumental Album Version)" – Bajofondo | Alex Da Silva | Smith in bottom 4 Reyes eliminated |
| Vincent Noiseux; Natalli Reznik | Krump | “Lost Boiz Anthem” – Tha J-Squad | Lil' C | Noiseux eliminated |
| Vincent Noiseux; Natalli Reznik | Contemporary | "Happy Ending" – Mika | Stacey Tookey | Noiseux eliminated |
| Nico Archambault; Lisa Auguste | Jazz-pop | "When I Grow Up" – The Pussycat Dolls | Blake McGrath | Auguste in bottom 4 |
| Nico Archambault; Lisa Auguste | Hip-hop | "Whatever You Like" – T.I. | Luther Brown | Auguste in bottom 4 |

==== Week 8 (November 26, 2008) ====
Judges: Jean-Marc Généreux, Tré Armstrong, Sean Cheesman, Mary Murphy

| Couple | Style | Music | Choreographer | Results |
|---|---|---|---|---|
| Nico Archambault; Natalli Reznik | Disco | "Knock on Wood" – Amii Stewart | Melissa Williams | Safe |
| Nico Archambault; Natalli Reznik | Quickstep | "Swingin' at the Savoy" – Mitch Woods & His Rocket 88's | Tony Meredith; Melanie LaPatin | Safe |
| Izaak Smith; Allie Bertram | Hip-hop | "Tell Me" – Diddy feat. Christina Aguilera | Luther Brown | Smith eliminated |
| Izaak Smith; Allie Bertram | Jazz | "Forever" – Chris Brown | Melissa Williams | Smith eliminated |
| Miles Faber; Lisa Auguste | Contemporary | "The Face" – RyanDan | Blake McGrath | Auguste eliminated |
| Miles Faber; Lisa Auguste | Cha-Cha | "Just Dance" – Lady Gaga feat. Colby O'Donis | Tony Meredith; Melanie LaPatin | Auguste eliminated |

- Top 6 contestants' solos:

| Contestant | Style | Music | Result |
| Miles Faber | Popping | "Get Up" – Vernon Burch | Safe |
| Allie Bertram | Ballet | "Variation V. Violente" – Tchaikovsky – Russian National Orchestra, Mikhail Pletnev from The Sleeping Beauty | Safe |
| Izaak Smith | Contemporary | "Alibis" – Marianas Trench | Eliminated |
| Lisa Auguste | Hip-hop | "The Hop" – Radio Citizen feat. Bajka | Eliminated |
| Nico Archambault | Contemporary | "Reckoner" – Radiohead | Safe |
| Natalli Reznik | Samba | "She Wants to Move" – N.E.R.D | Safe |

==== Week 9 (December 3, 2008) ====
Judges: Jean-Marc Généreux, Tré Armstrong, Luther Brown, Blake McGrath

| Couple | Style | Music | Choreographer |
|---|---|---|---|
| Nico Archambault; Allie Bertram; Miles Faber; Natalli Reznik | Street jazz | "Genesis" – Justice | Dan Karaty |
| Nico Archambault; Natalli Reznik | Salsa | "La Pelota" – Ray Barretto | Gustavo Vargas |
| Miles Faber; Natalli Reznik | Hip-hop | "Let's Get Dirty (I Can't Get in da Club)" – Redman | Sho-Tyme |
| Nico Archambault; Allie Bertram | Contemporary | "Permanent" – David Cook | Stacey Tookey |
| Miles Faber; Allie Bertram | Musical theatre | "Move (You're Steppin On My Heart)" (Dreamgirls) – Jennifer Holliday, Loretta Devine, Sheryl Lee Ralph | Sean Cheesman |
| Allie Bertram; Natalli Reznik | Go-go | "Drums a Go-Go" – The Hollywood Persuaders | Melissa Williams |
| Nico Archambault; Miles Faber | Capoeira | "A Amizade/Sacode A Poeira (Coro)" – Mestre Barrao / Axe Capoeira | Paul Becker |

- Top 4 contestants' solos:

| Contestant | Style | Music |
|---|---|---|
| Allie Bertram | Ballet | "Hide and Seek" – Imogen Heap |
| Miles Faber | Popping | "I Can Make You Dance" – Slick Dogg |
| Natalli Reznik | Cha-cha-cha | "Spanish Lesson" – Madonna |
| Nico Archambault | Contemporary | "Blue Orchid" – The White Stripes |

=== Results shows ===
==== Week 1 (October 9, 2008) ====
- Group dance: "Maculele" – Mestre Barrao Axe Capoeira (Maculelê; Choreographer: Paul Becker)
- Solos:

| Contestant | Style | Music | Result |
| Breanne Wong | Contemporary | "The Story" – Brandi Carlile | Eliminated |
| Natalli Reznik | Jive | "Proud Mary" – Ike and Tina Turner | Safe |
| Romina D'Ugo | Salsa | "La Negra Tiene Tumbao" – Celia Cruz | Safe |
| Francis Lafrenière | Jive | "Johnny B. Goode" – Chuck Berry | Safe |
| Kevin Mylrea | Contemporary | "The Hit Parade" – Unkle Bob | Eliminated |
| Dario Milard | Contemporary | "Breathe Me" – Sia | Safe |

- New pairs:
  - Francis Lafrenière and Natalli Reznik

==== Week 2 (October 16, 2008) ====
- Group dance: "Nagada, Nagada" from Jab We Met OST (Sonu Nigam & Javed Ali) (Bollywood; Choreographer: Nakul Dev Mahajan)
- Solos:

| Contestant | Style | Music | Result |
| Lisa Auguste | Contemporary | "I'm a Woman" – Koko Taylor | Safe |
| Dario Milard | Contemporary | "Ketto" – Bonobo | Eliminated |
| Romina D'Ugo | Salsa | "Hasta Que Se Rompa el Cuero" – La Sonora Caruseles | Eliminated |
| Vincent Noiseux | Jazz | "Black and Gold" – Sam Sparro | Safe |
| Caroline Torti | Contemporary | "Goodbye Apathy" – OneRepublic | Safe |
| Jesse Catibog | B-boying | "Four" – Miles Davis | Safe |

- New pairs:
  - None

==== Week 3 (October 23, 2008) ====
- Group dance: "Old School" – Hedley (Viennese waltz; Choreographer: Jean-Marc Genereux)
- Solos:

| Contestant | Style | Music | Result |
| Joey Matt | Contemporary | "This Year's Love" – David Gray | Eliminated |
| Tamina Pollack-Paris | Hip-hop | "Strip Tease" – Danity Kane | Eliminated |
| Francis Lafrenière | Cha-cha-cha | "Knock 'Em Out" – Lily Allen | Safe |
| Natalli Reznik | Latin | "Con toda palabra" – Lhasa de Sela | Safe |
| Izaak Smith | Contemporary | "Cry Me a River" – Julie London | Safe |
| Kaitlyn Fitzgerald | Contemporary | "Awake" – Secondhand Serenade | Safe |

- New pairs:
  - None

==== Week 4 (October 30, 2008) ====
- Group dance: "Dragula (Hot Rod Herman Remix)" – Rob Zombie (Rock jazz; Choreographer: Melissa Williams)
- Solos:

| Contestant | Style | Music | Result |
| Lisa Auguste | Contemporary | "Veins" – Charlotte Martin | Safe |
| Lara Smythe | Contemporary | "Blue Monday" – Flunk | Safe |
| Caroline Torti | Contemporary | "Your Ex-Lover is Dead" – Stars | Eliminated |
| Vincent Noiseux | Contemporary | "Hometown Glory" – Adele | Safe |
| Miles Faber | Popping | "So Ruff So Tuff" – Zapp and Roger | Safe |
| Jesse Catibog | B-boying | "Szerencsetlen" – Venetian Snares | Eliminated |

- New pairs:
  - None

==== Week 5 (November 6, 2008) ====
- Group dance: "I Surrender" – Celine Dion (contemporary; Choreographer: Blake McGrath)
- Solos:

| Contestant | Style | Music | Result |
| Miles Faber | Popping | "New Jack"–Justice | Safe |
| Francis Lafrenière | Jive | "Ain't Nothing Wrong With That" – Robert Randolph and the Family Band | Eliminated |
| Danny Arbour | Jive | "Save Your Scissors" – City and Colour | Safe |
| Lara Smythe | Contemporary | "Africa" – Toto | Eliminated |
| Natalli Reznik | Cha-cha-cha | "Toy Soldier" – Britney Spears | Safe |
| Allie Bertram | Ballet | "Don Quixote (ballet) (Act I)" – Ludwig Minkus | Safe |

- New pairs:
  - None. Now that only ten contestants remaining, new pairs are randomly assigned each week.

==== Week 6 (November 13, 2008) ====
- Group dance: "Any Other World" – Mika (contemporary; Choreographer: Mia Michaels)
- Solos:

| Contestant | Style | Music | Result |
| Kaitlyn Fitzgerald | Contemporary | "Hold You in My Arms" – Ray LaMontagne | Eliminated |
| Natalli Reznik | Rumba | "Querer" – Cirque Du Soleil | Safe |
| Miles Faber | Popping | "Bopgunn" – Olivier Day Soul | Safe |
| Danny Arbour | Ballroom | "Alger" – Jean Leloup | Eliminated |

==== Week 7 (November 20, 2008) ====
- Group dance: "Malaguena" – Brian Setzer '68 Comeback Special (Paso Doble; Choreographer: Jean-Marc Genereux)
- Solos: (all contestants had a solo regardless of status in the competition)
- Solos:

| Contestant | Style | Music | Result |
| Lisa Auguste | Contemporary | "Almost Lover" – A Fine Frenzy | Bottom 4 |
| Allie Bertram | Ballet | "Tiny Dancer" – Elton John | Safe |
| Natalli Reznik | | "Marvellous" – Dragonette | Safe |
| Arassay Reyes | Latin | | Eliminated |
| Nico Archambault | Jazz | "Seven Nation Army" – Alice Russell | Safe |
| Miles Faber | Popping | | Safe |
| Vincent Noiseux | Hip-hop | "Missin' You" – Trey Songz | Eliminated |
| Izaak Smith | Hip-hop | "I'm Mikey" – The Cool Kids | Bottom 4 |

==== Week 8 (November 27, 2008) ====
- Group dance: "Hollaback Girl" – Gwen Stefani (Step dance; Choreographer: Tré Armstrong)
- Solos:

| Contestant | Style | Music | Result |
| Lisa Auguste | Hip-hop | "The Damn Thing" – KariZma | Eliminated |
| Natalli Reznik | Samba | "Tambourine" – Eve | Safe |
| Allie Bertram | Ballet | "Runaround Sue" – Dion | Safe |
| Miles Faber | Popping | "Boogie Slide" – Divine Brown | Safe |
| Izaak Smith | Contemporary | "Heaven On Their Minds" – Carl Anderson from Jesus Christ Superstar | Eliminated |
| Nico Archambault | Contemporary | "Skip Divided (Modeselektor Remix)" – Thom Yorke | Eliminated |

==== Finale (December 7, 2008) ====
Judges: Jean-Marc Généreux, Tré Armstrong, Blake McGrath, Luther Brown, Mary Murphy, Rex Harrington, Mia Michaels

- Group dances:
  - Top 20: "Get Up" – 50 Cent (Hip-hop; Choreographer: Luther Brown)
  - Top 20: "Do You Love Me" – The Contours (Dirty Dancing-inspired; Choreographer: Tony Meredith & Melanie LaPatin)

===== Judges' picks =====
| Couple | Style | Music | Choreographer |
|---|---|---|---|
| Nico Archambault; Natalli Reznik | Disco | "Knock on Wood" – Amii Stewart | Melissa Williams |
| Danny Arbour; Allie Bertram | Mambo | "Mambo Gozon" – Tito Puente | Tony Meredith; Melanie LaPatin |
| Miles Faber; Lisa Auguste | Contemporary | "The Face" – RyanDan | Blake McGrath |
| Nico Archambault; Arassay Reyes | Lyrical jazz | "Somebody to Love" – Queen | Melissa Williams |
| Danny Arbour; Allie Bertram | Jive | "Rock This Town" – Stray Cats | Melissa Williams |
| Vincent Noiseux; Lisa Auguste | African jazz | "Hlohonolofatsa" – Soweto Gospel Choir | Sean Cheesman |
| Francis Lafrenière; Natalli Reznik | Salsa | "Hasta Que Se Rompa el Cuero" – Sonora Carruseles | Gustavo Vargas |
| Vincent Noiseux; Lisa Auguste | House (dance) | 100% Pure Love – Crystal Waters | Sho-Tyme |
| Miles Faber; Lara Smythe | Krump | "Tiny Ram Anthem" – Tha J-Squad | Lil' C |
| Vincent Noiseux; Natalli Reznik | Contemporary | "Happy Ending" – Mika | Stacey Tookey |
| Izaak Smith; Allie Bertram | Hip-hop | "Tell Me" – Diddy feat. Christina Aguilera | Luther Brown |
| Nico Archambault; Arassay Reyes | Jazz | It's a Man's Man's Man's World – James Brown | Paul Becker |
| Francis Lafrenière; Natalli Reznik | Paso Doble | "Espana Cani" – Manhattan Pops Orchestra | Tony Meredith; Melanie LaPatin |
| Miles Faber; Lara Smythe | Foxtrot | "Summer Wind" – Michael Bublé | Danny Quilliam |
| Izaak Smith; Kaitlyn Fitzgerald | Jazz-pop | "Breakin' Dishes" – Rihanna | Blake McGrath |
| Miles Faber; Allie Bertram | Samba | "Aguanile" – Hector Lavoe | Eric Caty |
| Nico Archambault; Natalli Reznik | Quickstep | "Swingin' at the Savoy" – Mitch Woods & His Rocket 88's | Tony Meredith; Melanie LaPatin |

- Eliminated:
  - Natalli Reznik
  - Miles Faber
- Runner-Up:
  - Allie Bertram
- Winner:
  - Nico Archambault

== Ratings ==
| # | Air Date | Viewers Performance | Viewers Results |
|---|---|---|---|
| 1 | September 11/14,2008 | 1,244,000 | N/A |
| 2 | September 17, 2008 | 931,000 | N/A |
| 3 | October 1, 2008 | 1,142,000 | N/A |
| 4 | October 8–9, 2008 | 1,444,000 | 735,000 |
| 5 | October 15–16, 2008 | 1,307,000 | 816,000 |
| 6 | October 22–23, 2008 | 1,302,000 | 755,000 |
| 7 | October 29–30, 2008 | 1,378,000 | 765,000 |
| 8 | November 5–6, 2008 | 1,431,000 | 823,000 |
| 9 | November 12–13, 2008 | 1,193,000 | 888,000 |
| 10 | November 19–20, 2008 | 1,427,000 | 1,027,000 |
| 11 | November 26–27, 2008 | 1,246,000 | 834,000 |
| 12 | December 3/7, 2008 | 1,470,000 | 1,664,000 |
