= So You Think You Can Dance Canada season 2 =

So You Think You Can Dance Canada
- Season 2
- Hosted by: Leah Miller
- Judges: Jean-Marc Généreux; Tré Armstrong; Blake McGrath; Luther Brown
- Winner: Tara-Jean Popowich
- Runner-up: Vincent Desjardins

Release
- Original network: CTV
- Original release: August 11 – October 25, 2009

Season chronology
- ← Previous; Season 1 Next → Season 3

Season 2 of So You Think You Can Dance Canada is a dance reality show and competition that airs on CTV. It is hosted by ETalk correspondent and former MuchMusic VJ Leah Miller.

The series is based on the original American TV series So You Think You Can Dance. Auditions started April 4, 2009 in Vancouver, British Columbia, and ended in Montreal, Quebec on May 26, 2009.

The show premiered on August 11, 2009. With Fox Broadcasting Company announcing the season six premiere of So You Think You Can Dance on September 9, 2009, both shows aired concurrently. Changes to the season included the winner receiving $100,000, the title of Canada's favourite dancer, and both the winner and runner-up both received a 2010 Mazda 3 Sport. Repeats of the performance and results show aired a week later on MuchMusic. On October 25, 2009, Tara-Jean Popowich was announced as "Canada's Favourite Dancer", winning the grand prize; the runner-up was Vincent Desjardins.

== Auditions ==
Open auditions for this season were held in the following locations:

Audition Venue	City	Date	Guest Judge(s)
The Centre in Vancouver for Performing Arts	Vancouver, British Columbia	April 4, 2009	Luther Brown and Mary Murphy
Winspear Centre	Edmonton, Alberta	April 7, 2009	Luther Brown and Stacey Tookey
Imperial Theatre	Saint John, New Brunswick	April 21, 2009	Melissa Williams and Sean Cheesman
Metro Toronto Convention Centre	Toronto, Ontario	May 18, 2009	Luther Brown and Mary Murphy
Théâtre Saint-Denis	Montreal, Quebec	May 26, 2009	Lil' C and Mia Michaels

=== Finals Week ===
The Top 2300 callbacks were held in the beginning of August 2009, at York University in Toronto, Ontario. 190 contestants were invited to participate in the callback auditions. This number was cut to 46 contestants, 23 female and 23 male, in the course of the week by Jean-Marc Genreux, Tre Armstrong, Blake McGrath, and Luther Brown, before the announcement of the season's top 20 contestants. Finals week included the following rounds, with cuts made after each:

- hip hop choreography by Luther Brown ("Bottle Pop" – The Pussycat Dolls)
- jazz funk choreography by Tre Armstrong ("Black & Gold" – Sam Sparro)
- a samba choreographed by Jean-Marc Généreux and France Mousseau ("I Owe It All To You" – Eva Avila)
- a group choreography round where the contestants were assigned into groups, were asked to choose a CD from a box, and choreographed their own routine to the music chosen
- contemporary choreography by Blake McGrath ("On Your Porch" – The Format)
- a final solo of the contestant's choice

== Finals ==
=== Elimination chart ===
Legend
Female	Male	Bottom 3 couples	Bottom 4 contestants

	Week:	08/26	09/02	09/09	09/16	09/23	09/30	10/07	10/14	10/25
	Contestant	Result								
Top 4	Tara-Jean Popowich									WINNER
Top 4	Vincent Desjardins	Btm 3		Btm 3	Btm 3					Runner-Up
Top 4	Jayme Rae Dailey				Btm 3	Btm 3				3rd Place
Top 4	Everett Smith							Btm 4		4th Place
Top 6	Emanuel Sandhu								Elim	
Top 6	Melanie Mah			Btm 3		Btm 3	Btm 4	Btm 4	Elim	
Top 8	Cody Bonnell			Btm 3		Btm 3	Btm 4	Elim		
Top 8	Kim Gingras							Elim		
Top 10	Austin Di Iulio	Btm 3	Btm 3			Btm 3	Elim			
Top 10	Amy Gardner	Btm 3		Btm 3	Btm 3		Elim			
Top 12	Daniel Dory				Btm 3	Elim				
Top 12	Corynne Barron		Btm 3			Elim				
Top 14	Danny Lawn				Elim					
Top 14	Natalie Lyons				Elim					
Top 16	Nicolas Bégin		Btm 3	Elim						
Top 16	Jenna-Lynn Higgins		Btm 3	Elim						
Top 18	Anthony Grafton		Elim							
Top 18	Melanie Buttarazzi	Btm 3	Elim							
Top 20	Taylor James	Elim								
Top 20	Tatiana Parker	Elim								

== Top 20 Contestants ==
=== Women ===
Contestant	Age	Home Town	Dance Style	Elimination date
Tara-Jean Popowich	20	Lethbridge, Alberta	Contemporary	Winner
Jayme Rae Dailey	21	Montreal, Quebec	Contemporary	3rd Place
Melanie Mah	19	Richmond Hill, Ontario	Contemporary	October 14, 2009
Kim Gingras	23	Montreal, Quebec	Hip-Hop	October 6, 2009
Amy Gardner	21	Calgary, Alberta	Contemporary	September 30, 2009
Corynne Barron	18	Edmonton, Alberta	Ballet	September 23, 2009
Natalie Lyons	23	Halifax, Nova Scotia	Krump	September 16, 2009
Jenna-Lynn Higgins	18	Ajax, Ontario	Jazz	September 9, 2009
Melanie Buttarazzi	22	Woodbridge, Ontario	Ballroom	September 2, 2009
Tatiana Parker	21	Toronto, Ontario	Hip-Hop	August 26, 2009

=== Men ===
Contestant	Age	Home Town	Dance Style	Elimination date
Vincent Desjardins	20	Trois-Rivières, Quebec	Ballroom	Runner-up
Everett Smith	25	Glen Morris, Ontario	Tap	4th Place
Emanuel Sandhu	28	Vancouver, British Columbia	Ballet	October 14, 2009
Cody Bonnell	19	Unionville, Ontario	Hip-Hop	October 6, 2009
Austin Di Iulio	19	Mississauga, Ontario	Contemporary	September 30, 2009
Daniel Dory	23	Montreal, Quebec	Hip-Hop	September 23, 2009
Danny Lawn	21	Brockville, Ontario	Contemporary	September 16, 2009
Nicolas Bégin	24	Montreal, Quebec	B-Boying	September 9, 2009
Anthony Grafton	24	Calgary, Alberta	Ballroom	September 2, 2009
Taylor James	22	Vancouver, British Columbia	Contemporary	August 26, 2009

== Finals ==
=== Performances ===
==== Week 1 (August 25, 2009) ====
Judges: Jean-Marc Généreux, Tré Armstrong, Blake McGrath, Luther Brown

Couple	Style	Music	Choreographer	Results
Tara-Jean Popowich; Everett Smith	Jive	"Lust for Life"—Iggy Pop	Melissa Williams	Safe
Amy Gardner; Vincent Desjardins	Samba	"Batucadas"—Mitoka Samba	Tony Meredith; Melanie LaPatin	Bottom 3
Melanie Mah; Cody Bonnell	Contemporary	"Taking Chances"—Celine Dion	Stacey Tookey	Safe
Kim Gingras; Emanuel Sandhu	Hip-hop	"Here Comes The Hammer"—MC Hammer	Sho-Tyme	Safe
Corynne Barron; Anthony Grafton	Viennese Waltz	"The Time of My Life"—David Cook	Pierre Allaire	Safe
Natalie Lyons; Danny Lawn	Hip-hop	"Get Buck In Here"—DJ Felli Fel feat. Diddy, Akon, Ludacris, and Lil Jon	Sho-Tyme	Safe
Jayme Rae Dailey; Daniel Dory	Afro-Jazz	"The Path"—Ralph MacDonald	Sean Cheesman	Safe
Jenna-Lynn Higgins; Nicolas Bégin	Disco	"Waking Up in Vegas"—Katy Perry	Melissa Williams	Safe
Tatiana Parker; Austin Di Iulio	Capoeira	"Segura O Coco"—Axé Capoeira	Paul Becker	Parker eliminated
Melanie Buttarazzi; Taylor James	Tango	"Diferente"—Gotan Project	Tony Meredith; Melanie LaPatin	James eliminated

==== Week 2 (September 1, 2009) ====
Judges: Jean-Marc Généreux, Tré Armstrong, Luther Brown, Mary Murphy

Couple	Style	Music	Choreographer	Results
Melanie Mah; Cody Bonnell	Krump	"Buck n' Roll"—Tha J-Squad	Lil' C	Safe
Tara-Jean Popowich; Everett Smith	Salsa	"Aña Pa' Mi Tambor"—La Excelencia	Tony Meredith; Melanie LaPatin	Safe
Kim Gingras; Emanuel Sandhu	Broadway	"Maybe This Time"—Connie Fisher	Sean Cheesman	Safe
Amy Gardner; Vincent Desjardins	Contemporary	"When You Say My Name"—Mario Spinetti	Blake McGrath	Safe
Jayme Rae Dailey; Daniel Dory	Dancehall	"So Fine"—Sean Paul	Jae Blaze	Safe
Corynne Barron; Anthony Grafton	Paso Doble	"Fuego"—bond	Tony Meredith; Melanie LaPatin	Grafton eliminated
Jenna-Lynn Higgins; Nicolas Bégin	Hip-hop	"Blast Off"—P Diddy feat. Mark Curry, G. Dep, Loon	Sho-Tyme	Bottom 3
Natalie Lyons; Danny Lawn	Jazz	"Please Don't Leave Me"—Pink	Melissa Williams	Safe
Melanie Buttarazzi; Austin Di Iulio	Smooth Waltz	"Nights in White Satin (Notte di Luce)"—Il Divo	Danny Quilliam	Buttarazzi eliminated

==== Week 3 (September 8, 2009) ====
Judges: Jean-Marc Généreux, Tré Armstrong, Sean Cheesman, Melissa Williams

Couple	Style	Music	Choreographer	Results
Kim Gingras; Emanuel Sandhu	Jazz-Pop	"Love Sex Magic"—Ciara featuring Justin Timberlake	Blake McGrath	Safe
Amy Gardner; Vincent Desjardins	Hip-hop	"Boom Boom Pow"—The Black Eyed Peas	Flii Stylz	Bottom 3
Corynne Barron; Austin Di Iulio	Contemporary	"Never Say Never"—The Fray	Stacey Tookey	Safe
Melanie Mah; Cody Bonnell	Mambo	"Suena Ahora"—Michi Sarmiento	Gustavo Vargas	Bottom 3
Tara-Jean Popowich; Everett Smith	Quickstep	"Chicago Overture"—Hot Rolls Ragtime Band	Pierre Allaire	Safe
Jayme Rae Dailey; Daniel Dory	Hip-hop	"Pucker Up"—Ciara	Luther Brown	Safe
Jenna-Lynn Higgins; Nicolas Bégin	Hustle	"Canned Heat"—Jamiroquai	Benji Schwimmer	Both eliminated
Natalie Lyons; Danny Lawn	Rumba	"Historia De Un Amor"—Perez Prado	Gustavo Vargas	Safe

==== Week 4 (September 15, 2009) ====
Judges: Jean-Marc Généreux, Tré Armstrong, Karen Kain, Dan Karaty

Couple	Style	Music	Choreographer	Results
Melanie Mah; Cody Bonnell	Hip-hop	"Turnin Me On"—Keri Hilson featuring Lil Wayne	Luther Brown	Safe
Amy Gardner; Vincent Desjardins	Cha-cha-cha	"Rie y Llora"—Celia Cruz	Gustavo Vargas	Bottom 3
Tara-Jean Popowich; Everett Smith	House	"When Love Takes Over"—David Guetta featuring Kelly Rowland	Sho-Tyme	Safe
Kim Gingras; Emanuel Sandhu	Contemporary	"To Build a Home"—The Cinematic Orchestra	Stacey Tookey	Safe
Jayme Rae Dailey; Daniel Dory	Disco	"Disco Inferno"—The Trammps	Melissa Williams	Bottom 3
Natalie Lyons; Danny Lawn	West Coast Swing	"Love Lockdown"—Kanye West	Benji Schwimmer; Donyelle Jones	Both eliminated
Corynne Barron; Austin Di Iulio	Jazz	"Paparazzi"—Lady Gaga	Johnny Byrne	Safe

==== Week 5 (September 22, 2009) ====
Judges: Jean-Marc Généreux, Tré Armstrong, Rex Harrington, Mia Michaels

Couple	Style	Music	Choreographer	Results
Tara-Jean Popowich; Everett Smith	Broadway	"This Joint is Jumpin'" from Ain't Misbehavin' (Original cast)	Sean Cheesman	Safe
Melanie Mah; Cody Bonnell	Jazz	"Glory Box"—Portishead	Melissa Williams	Bottom 3
Corynne Barron; Austin Di Iulio	Salsa	"I Know You Want Me (Calle Ocho)"—Pitbull"	Tony Meredith; Melanie LaPatin	Barron eliminated
Kim Gingras; Emanuel Sandhu	Hip-hop	"Respect My Conglomerate"—Busta Rhymes feat. Lil Wayne & Jadakiss	Luther Brown	Safe
Jayme Rae Dailey; Daniel Dory	Contemporary	"It Must Have Been Love"—Kari Kimmel	Blake McGrath	Dory eliminated
Amy Gardner; Vincent Desjardins	Jive	"Pony Time"—Chubby Checker	Tony Meredith; Melanie LaPatin	Safe

==== Week 6 (September 29, 2009) ====
Judges: Jean-Marc Généreux, Tré Armstrong, Blake McGrath, Luther Brown

Couple	Style	Music	Choreographer	Results
Melanie Mah; Vincent Desjardins	Paso Doble	"Conquest"—The White Stripes	Francis Lafrenière; Natalli Reznick	Mah in bottom 4
Amy Gardner; Cody Bonnell	Contemporary	"Come Home"—OneRepublic feat. Sara Bareilles	Stacey Tookey	Gardner eliminated Bonnell in bottom 4
Tara-Jean Popowich; Emanuel Sandhu	Samba	"Samba Vocalizado (The Vocal Samba)"—Luciano Perrone	Tony Meredith; Melanie LaPatin	Safe
Kim Gingras; Everett Smith	Jazz-fusion	"St. James Infirmary Blues"—The White Stripes	Sean Cheesman	Safe
Jayme Rae Dailey; Austin Di Iulio	Hip hop	"Da Rockwilder"—Method Man & Redman	Sho-Tyme	Di Iulio eliminated

- Top 10 contestants' solos:

Contestant	Style	Music	Result
Kim Gingras	Hip-hop	"Kiss from a Rose"—Seal	Safe
Everett Smith	Tap	"Everybody Dance"—Chic	Safe
Jayme Rae Dailey	Jazz	"Make Me Over"—Keyshia Cole	Safe
Austin Di Iulio	Contemporary	"Always Midnight"—Patrick Monahan	Eliminated
Amy Gardner	Contemporary	"Wanted"—Vanessa Carlton	Eliminated
Cody Bonnell	Hip-hop	"I Need a Girl (Part Two)"—Diddy feat. Ginuwine, Loon, Mario Winans and Tammy Ruggeri	Bottom 4
Melanie Mah	Jazz	"The Fame"—Lady Gaga	Bottom 4
Vincent Desjardins	Samba	"Can You Feel It?"—Reel 2 Real	Safe
Tara-Jean Popowich	Contemporary	"Relief"—Chris Garneau	Safe
Emanuel Sandhu	Jazz	"Bridge"—Amon Tobin	Safe

==== Week 7 (October 6, 2009) ====
Judges: Jean-Marc Généreux, Tré Armstrong, Dan Karaty, Mia Michaels

- Top 4 boys: "Beggin'"—The Four Seasons (Musical Theatre; Choreographer: Melissa Williams)
- Top 4 girls: "Dr. Feelgood (Love Is a Serious Business)"—Aretha Franklin (Musical Theatre; Choreographer: Sean Cheesman)

Couple	Style	Music	Choreographer	Results
Tara-Jean Popowich; Vincent Desjardins	Rumba	"Hero"—Enrique Iglesias	Eric Caty	Safe
Tara-Jean Popowich; Vincent Desjardins	Krump	"Chea-Chea-Chea"—Tha J-Squad	Lil' C	Safe
Kim Gingras; Cody Bonnell	Hip-hop	"Humpin' Around"—Bobby Brown	Luther Brown	Both eliminated
Kim Gingras; Cody Bonnell	Smooth Waltz	"What a Wonderful World"—Louis Armstrong	Pierre Allaire	Both eliminated
Melanie Mah; Emanuel Sandhu	Contemporary	"The Scientist"—Coldplay	Sabrina Matthews	Mandhu in bottom 4
Melanie Mah; Emanuel Sandhu	Disco	"Hush Hush"—The Pussycat Dolls	Melissa Williams	Mandhu in bottom 4
Jayme Rae Dailey; Everett Smith	Mambo	"En Barranquilla Me Quedo"—Joe Arroyo	Gustavo Vargas	Smith in bottom 4
Jayme Rae Dailey; Everett Smith	Jazz-Pop	"Sexy Chick"—David Guetta feat. Akon	Nico Archambault; Wynn Holmes	Smith in bottom 4

- Top 8 contestants' solos:

Contestant	Style	Music	Result
Jayme Rae Dailey	Contemporary	"Getting in the Way"—Jill Scott	Safe
Everett Smith	Tap	"Stand by Me"—Ben E. King	Bottom 4
Melanie Mah	Contemporary	"Innocence"—Björk	Bottom 4
Emanuel Sandhu	Contemporary	"Mad World"—Adam Lambert	Safe
Kim Gingras	Hip-hop	"Jerk It"—Thunderheist	Eliminated
Cody Bonnell	Hip-hop	"Missin' You"—Trey Songz	Eliminated
Tara-Jean Popowich	Contemporary	"Farewell"—Rosie Thomas	Safe
Vincent Desjardins	Cha-cha-cha	"U Can't Touch This"—MC Hammer	Safe

==== Week 8 (October 13, 2009) ====
Judges: Jean-Marc Généreux, Tré Armstrong, Rex Harrington, Mary Murphy

- Top 3 girls: "Concerto for 2 Violins in D Minor, BWV 1043: II. Largo Ma non Tanto (J.S. Bach)"—The Scottish Ensemble/Jonathan Rees (Contemporary, Choreographer: Mia Michaels)
- Top 3 boys: "Get Up Offa That Thing"—James Brown (Suave-Funk; Choreographer: Gustavo Vargas)

Couple	Style	Music	Choreographer	Results
Tara-Jean Popowich; Vincent Desjardins	Salsa	"Vengo Caliente"–Sonora Carruseles	Gustavo Vargas	Safe
Tara-Jean Popowich; Vincent Desjardins	Contemporary	"It Doesn't Hurt" (Studio Version)—Katie Thompson	Stacey Tookey	Safe
Melanie Mah; Everett Smith	Jazz-Rock	"Burn It to the Ground"—Nickelback	Melissa Williams	Mandhu eliminated
Melanie Mah; Everett Smith	Hip-hop	"That's Right"—Ciara	Luther Brown	Mandhu eliminated
Jayme Rae Dailey; Emanuel Sandhu	Quickstep	"Let's Go"—Hipjoint feat. Sherry St. Germain	Pierre Allaire	Sandhu eliminated
Jayme Rae Dailey; Emanuel Sandhu	Jazz-Pop	"I Gotta Feeling"—The Black Eyed Peas	Blake McGrath	Sandhu eliminated

- Top 6 contestants' solos:

Contestant	Style	Music	Result
Jayme Rae Dailey	Contemporary	"As Much As I Ever Could"—City and Colour	Safe
Tara-Jean Popowich	Contemporary	"Fever"—Michael Bublé	Safe
Melanie Mah	Contemporary	"The District Sleeps Alone Tonight"—The Postal Service	Eliminated
Everett Smith	Tap	"Shake Your Pants"—Cameo	Safe
Emanuel Sandhu	Jazz	"Whole Lotta Love"—Led Zeppelin	Eliminated
Vincent Desjardins	Cha-cha-cha	"Ai Mi Morena" (Chocolate Restyle)—Mo' Horizons	Safe

==== Week 9 (October 20, 2009) ====
Judges: Jean-Marc Généreux, Tré Armstrong, Blake McGrath, Luther Brown

Contestants	Style	Music	Choreographer
Jayme Rae Dailey; Vincent Desjardins; Tara-Jean Popowich; Everett Smith	Cabaret	"Theme for Gypsy (Shivas Regal)"—Sonny Lester & His Orchestra	Tony Meredith; Melanie LaPatin
Vincent Desjardins; Everett Smith	Hip-hop	"B.O.B."—Outkast	Sho-Tyme
Tara-Jean Popowich; Everett Smith	Jazz	"Say (All I Need)"—OneRepublic	Sean Cheesman
Jayme Rae Dailey; Tara-Jean Popowich	Mambo	"Ran Kan Kan"—Tito Puente	Tony Meredith; Melanie LaPatin
Jayme Rae Dailey; Vincent Desjardins	Contemporary	"Can't Stop Thinking About You"—Martin Sexton	Stacey Tookey
Tara-Jean Popowich; Vincent Desjardins	Hustle	"Last Dance"—Donna Summer	Maria Torres
Jayme Rae Dailey; Everett Smith	Samba	"Run the Show"—Kat DeLuna	Eric Caty; Kelly Lannan

- Top 4 contestants' solos:

Contestant	Style	Music
Everett Smith	Tap	"Style"—Cameo
Jayme Rae Dailey	Jazz	"Racadiones Arrabaleras"—Bailingo!
Vincent Desjardins	Jive	"Land of a Thousand Dances"—Wilson Pickett
Tara-Jean Popowich	Contemporary	Bleeding Love"—Boyce Avenue

=== Results shows ===
==== Week 1 (August 26, 2009) ====
- Group dance: "I Want You Back/ABC"—Jackson 5 (Michael Jackson Tribute; Choreographer: Gil Duldulao)
- Solos:

Contestants	Style	Music	Result
Melanie Buttarazzi	Jive	"Land of a Thousand Dances"—Wilson Pickett	Safe
Amy Gardner	Contemporary	"Possession"—Sarah McLachlan	Safe
Tatiana Parker	Hip-hop	"Starstruck"—Lady Gaga	Eliminated
Taylor James	Contemporary	"Swans"—Unkle Bob	Eliminated
Vincent Desjardins	Cha-cha-cha	"Kaboom"—Ursula 1000	Safe
Austin Di Iulio	Modern	"An Epic Age"—Immediate	Safe

- New pairs:
  - Melanie Buttarazzi and Austin Di Iulio

==== Week 2 (September 2, 2009) ====
- Group dance: "JBJ" from Jhoom Barabar Jhoom (Bollywood; Choreographer: Longinus Fernandes)
- Solos:

Contestants	Style	Music	Result
Anthony Grafton	Samba	"King of the Dancehall"—Beenie Man	Eliminated
Nicolas Bégin	B-boying	"Super Bad"—James Brown	Safe
Austin Di Iulio	Contemporary	"Overkill"—Colin Hay	Safe
Corynne Barron	Contemporary	"The Moment I Said It"—Imogen Heap	Safe
Jenna-Lynn Higgins	Jazz	"No Man"—Nina Storey	Safe
Melanie Buttarazzi	Flamenco	"Desert Chase"—Robert Michaels	Eliminated

- New Pairs:
  - Corynne Barron and Austin Di Iulio

==== Week 3 (September 9, 2009) ====
- Group dance: "Malagenha"—Sérgio Mendes (African/Brazilian; Choreographer: Jean-Marc Généreux)
- Solos:

Contestants	Style	Music	Result
Jenna-Lynn Higgins	Jazz	"I Gotta Feeling"—The Black Eyed Peas	Eliminated
Amy Gardner	Jazz	"Yummy"—Gwen Stefani	Safe
Melanie Mah	Contemporary	"A Little More of You"—Ashley Chambliss	Safe
Nicolas Bégin	B-boying	"Pavlo Style"—Pavlo	Eliminated
Vincent Desjardins	Jive	"Reet Petite"—Jackie Wilson	Safe
Cody Bonnell	Hip-hop	"Love Struck"—VFactory	Safe

- New pairs:

- None

==== Week 4 (September 16, 2009) ====
- Group dance: "LoveGame"—Lady Gaga (Jazz-Funk; Choreographer: Blake McGrath)
- Solos:

Contestants	Style	Music	Result
Amy Gardner	Jazz	"LTLP" — Edit	Safe
Jayme Rae Dailey	Contemporary	"Feeling Good"—Michael Bublé	Safe
Natalie Lyons	Krumping	"Boom Boom Clap"—Tha J-Squad	Eliminated
Vincent Desjardins	Jive	"We're Gonna Win"—Bryan Adams	Safe
Daniel Dory	Hip-hop	"A Milli"—Lil Wayne	Safe
Danny Lawn	Contemporary	"The Freshmen"—Jay Brannan	Eliminated

- New pairs:

- None

==== Week 5 (September 23, 2009) ====
- Group dance: "The Jump Off"—Lil' Kim featuring Mr. Cheeks (Hip-hop; Choreographer: Luther Brown)
- Solos:

Contestants	Style	Music	Result
Melanie Mah	Contemporary	"Headlock"—Imogen Heap	Safe
Corynne Barron	Contemporary	"Almost Lover"—A Fine Frenzy	Eliminated
Jayme Rae Dailey	Contemporary	"Nothing"—Nikka Costa	Safe
Cody Bonnell	Hip-hop	"Curious"—Danny Fernandes	Safe
Austin Di Iulio	Contemporary	"Sweet Dream"—Greg Laswell	Safe
Daniel Dory	Hip-hop	"It Was All In Your Mind"—Wade Robson	Eliminated

- New pairs:

Once contestants make it into the top ten, new pairs are assigned randomly.

==== Week 6 (September 30, 2009) ====
- Group dance: "Hometown Glory"—Adele (Contemporary; Choreographer: Stacey Tookey)
- Solos:

Contestants	Style	Music	Result
Amy Gardner	Contemporary	"Belief"—Gavin DeGraw	Eliminated
Melanie Mah	Contemporary	"18th Floor Balcony"—Blue October	Safe
Cody Bonnell	Hip-hop	"Butterfly"—Jason Mraz	Safe
Austin Di Iulio	Popping	"Genesis"—Justice	Eliminated

==== Week 7 (October 7, 2009) ====
- Group dance: "C'mon Everybody" from All Shook Up—Cheyenne Jackson and Co. (Broadway; Choreographer: Tyce Diorio)
- Solos:

Contestants	Style	Music	Result
Kim Gingras	Hip-hop	"Bottle Pop"—The Pussycat Dolls	Eliminated
Melanie Mah	Contemporary	"Elephant in the Room"—Richard Walters	Safe
Cody Bonnell	Hip-hop	"Last Time" (Remix)—George Nozuka	Eliminated
Everett Smith	Tap	"When the Night Feels My Song"—Bedouin Soundclash	Safe

==== Week 8 (October 14, 2009) ====
- Group dance: "Turn the Beat Around"—Vicki Sue Robinson (Disco; Choreographer: Tre Armstrong)
- Top 6 contestants' solos:

Contestant	Style	Music	Result
Jayme Rae Dailey	Contemporary	"I'm Not Afraid"—Jill Scott	Safe
Melanie Mah	Contemporary	"On Your Porch"—The Format	Eliminated
Tara-Jean Popowich	Contemporary	"The Waves"—Elisa	Safe
Vincent Desjardins	Latin		Safe
Everett Smith	Tap	"Oh...Canada"—Classified	Safe
Emanuel Sandhu	Jazz	"Let's Dance"—David Bowie	Eliminated

==== Week 9 (October 25, 2009) ====
Judges: Jean-Marc Généreux, Tré Armstrong, Blake McGrath, Luther Brown, Rex Harrington, Kenny Ortega

- Group dances:

- Top 20: (African Jazz; Choreographer: Sean Cheesman)
- Top 18: "JBJ" from Jhoom Barabar Jhoom (Bollywood; Choreographer: Longinus Fernandes)
- Top 10: "This Moment"—Nic Chagall ft. Jonathan Mendelsohn (Contemporary; Choreographer: Mia Michaels)

===== Judges' picks =====
Couple	Style	Music	Choreographer	Chosen by
Tara-Jean Popowich; Everett Smith	Musical Theater	"This Joint is Jumpin'" from Ain't Misbehavin' (Original cast)	Sean Cheesman	Kenny Ortega
Amy Gardner; Vincent Desjardins	Jive	"Pony Time"—Chubby Checker	Tony Meredith; Melanie LaPatin	Jean-Marc Généreux
Jayme Rae Dailey; Everett Smith	Mambo	"En Barranquilla Me Quedo"—Joe Arroyo	Gustavo Vargas	Rex Harrington
Kim Gingras; Cody Bonnell	Hip-hop	"Humpin' Around"—Bobby Brown	Luther Brown	Blake McGrath
Tara-Jean Popowich; Vincent Desjardins	Rumba	"Hero"—Enrique Iglesias	Eric Caty	Jean-Marc Généreux
Kim Gingras; Emanuel Sandhu	Jazz-Pop	"Love Sex Magic"—Ciara featuring Justin Timberlake	Blake McGrath	Tré Armstrong
Jayme Rae Dailey; Vincent Desjardins	Contemporary	"Can't Stop Thinking About You"—Martin Sexton	Stacey Tookey	Tré Armstrong
Tara-Jean Popowich; Everett Smith	House	"When Love Takes Over"—David Guetta featuring Kelly Rowland	Sho-Tyme	Luther Brown
Melanie Mah; Vincent Desjardins	Paso Doble	"Conquest"—The White Stripes	Francis Lafrenière; Natalli Reznick	Kenny Ortega
Corynne Barron; Austin Di Iulio	Contemporary	"Never Say Never"—The Fray	Stacey Tookey	Jean-Marc Généreux
Melanie Mah; Cody Bonnell	Krump	"Buck n' Roll"—Tha J-Squad	Lil' C	Leah Miller
Kim Gingras; Everett Smith	Jazz-Pop	"St. James Infirmary Blues"—The White Stripes	Sean Cheesman	Blake McGrath
Tara-Jean Popowich; Vincent Desjardins	Contemporary	"It Doesn't Hurt" (Studio Version)—Katie Thompson	Stacey Tookey	Rex Harrington
Jayme Rae Dailey; Daniel Dory	Dancehall	"So Fine"—Sean Paul	Jae Blaze	Luther Brown
Tara-Jean Popowich; Vincent Desjardins	Salsa	"Vengo Caliente"–Sonora Carruseles	Gustavo Vargas	N/A
Jayme Rae Dailey; Everett Smith	Jazz-Pop	"Sexy Chick"—David Guetta feat. Akon	Nico Archambault; Wynn Holmes	N/A

- Eliminated:

- Everett Smith
- Jayme Rae Dailey

- Runner-up:

- Vincent Desjardins

- WINNER:

- Tara-Jean Popowich
