= So You Think You Can Dance Canada =

- Created by: Simon Fuller; Nigel Lythgoe
- Directed by: Don Weiner; Al Manson
- Presented by: Leah Miller
- Judges: Jean-Marc Généreux; Tré Armstrong
- Country of origin: Canada
- No. of episodes: 92

Production
- Executive producers: Sandra Faire; Trisa Dayot
- Running time: Varies
- Production companies: Danse TV Productions; 19 Entertainment; Dick Clark Productions

Original release
- Network: CTV; MuchMusic; CTV 2
- Release: September 11, 2008 – September 11, 2011

So You Think You Can Dance Canada is a dance competition and reality show that aired on CTV.

Based on the original American TV show So You Think You Can Dance, the Canadian series showcased the best in Canadian dancing talent. Each season, the show held auditions in major cities across the country, looking for the top contestants in Canada. Contestants of all genres and styles tried to impress the judges in the hopes of making the Top 20, which gave them the opportunity to perform on national television.

During each week's performance show, couples competed for the votes of the viewing public; the three couples receiving the fewest votes are forced to "dance for their lives" during the results show in an attempt to prove to the judges that they deserve to stay. Following this, the judges sent home one woman and one man from the competition — for the first five weeks, the judges themselves chose who stays and who goes, but starting in Top 10 week, the voters alone decided which dancers continued on in the competition. Ultimately, one contestant prevailed. During the season finale, this person was crowned "Canada's Favourite Dancer", and received a prize of CDN $100,000 and a new car. In Seasons 2 and 3, the runner-up also received a new car.

The show was hosted by former ETalk correspondent and MuchMusic VJ Leah Miller. The judging panel featured two permanent judges, Jean-Marc Généreux and Tré Armstrong, and usually two rotating guest judge spots. Over the years, guest judges have included Karen Kain and Rex Harrington from the National Ballet of Canada, High School Musical director Kenny Ortega, well-known Broadway choreographer Sergio Trujillo, and Mary Murphy and Dan Karaty, who are both veteran judges on the US version of the show.

During its run, the show featured many well-known Canadian choreographers, including Luther Brown, Blake McGrath, Stacey Tookey, Sean Cheesman, Melissa Williams, Sabrina Matthews and Paul Becker. In addition, many choreographers from the US version of the show have also done work for So You Think You Can Dance Canada including Mia Michaels, Mandy Moore, Tony Meredith and Melanie LaPatin, Benji Schwimmer, Lil' C and Tyce Diorio. As in the American edition, the show's choreographers may also sometimes act as guest judges.

The show has also been noted for being one of the first SYTYCD shows in the world to introduce some international dance styles, including African jazz, Jamaican dancehall and India's Bollywood into the competition.

On September 13, 2011, two days after the fourth-season finale, CTV announced that it was not renewing So You Think You Can Dance Canada. In its announcement, the network noted that Season 4 was the lowest rated season to date, having lost 31% of its viewership since its initial season. However, it is difficult to compare ratings across seasons, as the first three installments aired in the fall, while the fourth aired in the summer - which traditionally has lower viewership across the board.

Season 4 still garnered over one million viewers and was the networks number 2 Canadian entertainment series and number 1 in the 18-34 demographic.

== Seasons ==
Male contestant	Female contestant

Season	Dates	Winner	Finalists			Host	Judge(s)
1	Fall 2008; September–December	Nico Archambault ^{1} (Contemporary)	Allie Bertram (Ballet)	Miles Faber (Hip Hop)	Natalli Reznik (Latin)	Leah Miller	Jean-Marc Généreux; Tré Armstrong; Guest Judges
2	Summer/Fall 2009 (August–October)	Tara-Jean Popowich^{1} (Contemporary)	Vincent Desjardins (Ballroom)	Jayme-Rae Dailey (Jazz)	Everett Smith (Tap)	Leah Miller	Jean-Marc Généreux; Tré Armstrong; Guest Judges
3	Summer/Fall 2010 (August–October)	Denys Drozdyuk (Ballroom)	Amanda Cleghorn (Contemporary)	Jeff Mortensen (Contemporary)	Janick Arseneau^{1} (Contemporary)	Leah Miller	Jean-Marc Généreux; Tré Armstrong; Guest Judges
4^{2}	Summer 2011 (June–September)	Jordan Clark (Contemporary)	Melissa Mitro (Contemporary)	Matt Marr^{1} (Contemporary)		Leah Miller	Jean-Marc Généreux; Tré Armstrong; Guest Judges

^1These contestants are the only ones to have never been in the bottom three couples or the bottom four contestants throughout the entire season. In addition, Popowich is the first female winner from any SYTYCD show to not have placed in the bottom three/four during the show's run.
^2Season 4's finale had six participants. However, only the placement of the Top 3 was revealed.

=== Season 1 ===
In October 2007, CTV announced plans to start production on a Canadian version of the hit American TV series So You Think You Can Dance. Auditions were held between April and June 2008 in Vancouver, Halifax, Calgary, Montreal and Toronto. It was announced that Muchmusic VJ Leah Miller would be hosting the series, with renowned choreographers Jean-Marc Généreux and Tré Armstrong becoming permanent judges. Hip-hop choreographer Luther Brown and former US competitor Blake McGrath also joined the cast as alternating third judges.

The first season premiered on September 11, 2008. Throughout the season many notable guest stars from the world of dance appeared on the show, including Mary Murphy, Dan Karaty, Kenny Ortega, and Mia Michaels, who choreographed a group piece.

The finale was held on December 7, 2008. Contemporary dancer Nico Archambault of Montreal was declared the winner, with ballet dancer Allie Bertram of Calgary as runner-up, hip hop dancer Miles Faber of Calgary in third, and Latin dancer Natalli Reznik of Toronto in fourth. Archambault was awarded $100,000 and a 2009 C230 Mercedes-Benz.

=== Season 2 ===
Auditions for season 2 took place from April to May 2009 in Vancouver, Edmonton, Saint John, Toronto and Montreal.

Leah Miller, Jean-Marc Généreux and Tré Armstrong returned for season 2 which premiered August 11, 2009. Due to the US show airing a fall season, CTV programmed the Canadian version on their network while the US version aired on A.

The finale was held October 25, 2009. Contemporary dancer Tara-Jean Popowich of Lethbridge, Alberta was declared the winner, with ballroom dancer Vincent Desjardins of Trois-Rivières, Québec as runner-up, jazz dancer Jayme-Rae Dailey of Montreal in third, and tap dancer Everett Smith of Glen Morris, Ontario in fourth. Both Popowich and Desjardins were awarded a Mazda 3 Sport, and Popowich received $100,000.

=== Season 3 ===
Leah Miller returned as host in Season 3 and was joined by returning judges and dance experts Jean-Marc Généreux, Tré Armstrong, Luther Brown and Blake McGrath. Guest judges throughout the five-city audition tour and Finals Week include Edmonton native Stacey Tookey (Calgary auditions), Mary Murphy (Toronto and Vancouver auditions), Mia Michaels (Montreal auditions), Dan Karaty (Halifax auditions), Rex Harrington and Sean Cheesman (Finals Week).

The finale was held on October 24, 2010. Ballroom dancer Denys Drozdyuk of Toronto was declared the winner, with contemporary dancer Amanda Cleghorn of Mississauga, Ontario as runner-up, contemporary dancer Jeff Mortensen of Edmonton, Alberta in third, and contemporary dancer Janick Arseneau in fourth. Both Drozdyuk and Cleghorn were awarded a brand new Mazda 2, and Drozdyuk received $100,000.

The season 3 finale also saw the establishment of the So You Think You Can Dance Canada Top 4 Fund, where cash prizes would also be awarded to the three runners up: second place dancer Amanda Cleghorn received $10,000, and third place Jeffrey Mortensen and fourth place Janick Arseneau were each awarded $5,000.

=== Season 4 ===
It was announced during the fifth week of competition in season three that the show has been renewed for a fourth season. Auditions took place in November and December 2010. The season premiere aired on CTV on June 20, 2011, and the show will continue to air every Monday and Tuesday at 8pm beginning June 27, 2011.

The finale was held on September 11, 2011; for the only time in the show's four-season run, six dancers competed in the finale rather than four. Jordan Clark of Tottenham, Ontario was declared the winner, receiving a 2011 Chevy Cruze and $100,000. Melissa Mitro of Richmond Hill, Ontario was runner-up, also receiving a 2011 Chevy Cruze and $10,000. The remaining four finalists — Lindsay Leuschner of Stouffville, Ontario, Matt Marr of Quispamsis, New Brunswick, Christian Millette of Montreal and Shane Simpson of Thornhill, Ontario — each received $5,000 from the Sandra Faire and Ivan Fecan Dance Fund.

== See also ==
- Dance on television
