= Luther Brown =

Canadian choreographer/artistic director (born 1973)

- Born: September 18, 1974 (age 52); Kingston, Jamaica
- Occupation: Choreographer/artistic director

Luther Brown is a Canadian choreographer/artistic director. Born in Kingston, Jamaica, and raised in Toronto, Ontario, he is best known as a hip hop dance choreographer for movies, television and commercials. Brown is a regular choreographer for the television dance competition So You Think You Can Dance and So You Think You Can Dance Canada, for which he was a choreographer and a judge. Brown is a co-founder of Do Dat Entertainment.

In addition to his television work, Brown has choreographed over 100 music videos for artists including Janet Jackson, P.Diddy, Jully Black, Shawn Desman, Alicia Keys, Brandy, Christina Aguilera, Nicki Minaj and Big Bang.

== Early life and education ==
Brown's father ran a community radio show, The Caribbean Crucible, on Toronto's 105.5 FM, then the York University radio station. Brown later stated that helping his father gave him an ear for music. Throughout high school he was active in dance and step teams, as well as being a songwriter.

Brown continued to develop his choreographic style with the step dance squad he founded while studying at the University of Windsor.

== Career ==
While still in university, Brown began to choreograph for many important artists in the Toronto hip-hop community of the 1990s. This included shows for Jully Black, Michie Mee, Dream Warriors and Maestro Fresh Wes. In 2003, he found his first opportunity to choreograph for American performers when he was invited to work on a music video for the rappers Cam'ron and Mase.

In 2007 Brown was awarded Outstanding Choreography in a Commercial from the Choreography Media Awards for his work with Nike.

Beginning in 2008, Brown worked as a judge and choreographer for the Canadian version of the television show So You Think You Can Dance. He was a choreographer for the final season of the American version. He has also made guest appearances on the X-Factor, Making the Band 4 and the Canadian TV show The Next Step.

In 2013, Brown worked with the Korean Boy Band BigBang.

Brown is a dedicated dance teacher who teaches internationally in venues ranging from community centres and high schools to large-scale dance conventions.

=== Choreography for So You Think You Can Dance ===
Season	Week	Dancers	Style	Music
Season 1 (Canada)	Week 3	Tamina Pollack-Paris; Joey Matt	Hip-Hop	"Ditch That..."—The-Dream
Season 1 (Canada)	Week 4	Arassay Reyes; Nico Archambault	Hip-Hop	"Don't Touch Me (Throw da Water on 'em)"—Busta Rhymes
Season 1 (Canada)	Week 5	Allie Bertram; Danny Arbour	Hip-Hop	"In The Ayer"—Flo Rida feat. will.i.am
Season 1 (Canada)	Week 7	Lisa Auguste; Nico Archambault	Hip-Hop	"Whatever You Like"—T.I.
Season 1 (Canada)	Week 8	Allie Bertram; Izaak Smith	Hip-Hop	"Tell Me"—Diddy feat. Christina Aguilera
Season 1 (Canada)	Finale	Top 20	Hip-Hop	"Get Up"—50 Cent
Season 2 (Canada)	Week 3	Jayme Rae Dailey; Daniel Dory	Hip-Hop	"Pucker Up"—Ciara
Season 2 (Canada)	Week 4	Melanie Mah; Cody Bonnell	Hip-Hop	"Turnin Me On"—Keri Hilson feat Lil Wayne
Season 2 (Canada)	Week 5	Kim Gingras; Emanuel Sandhu	Hip-Hop	"Respect My Conglomerate"—Busta Rhymes feat Lil Wayne & Jadakiss
Season 2 (Canada)	Week 5	Top 12; Group Routine	Hip-Hop	"The Jump Off"—Lil' Kim feat Mr Cheeks
Season 2 (Canada)	Week 7	Kim Gingras; Cody Bonnell	Hip-Hop	"Humpin' Around"—Bobby Brown
Season 2 (Canada)	Week 8	Melanie Mah; Everett Smith	Hip-Hop	"That's Right"—Ciara
