= Jean-Marc Généreux =

Ballroom dance champion and choreographer (born 1962)

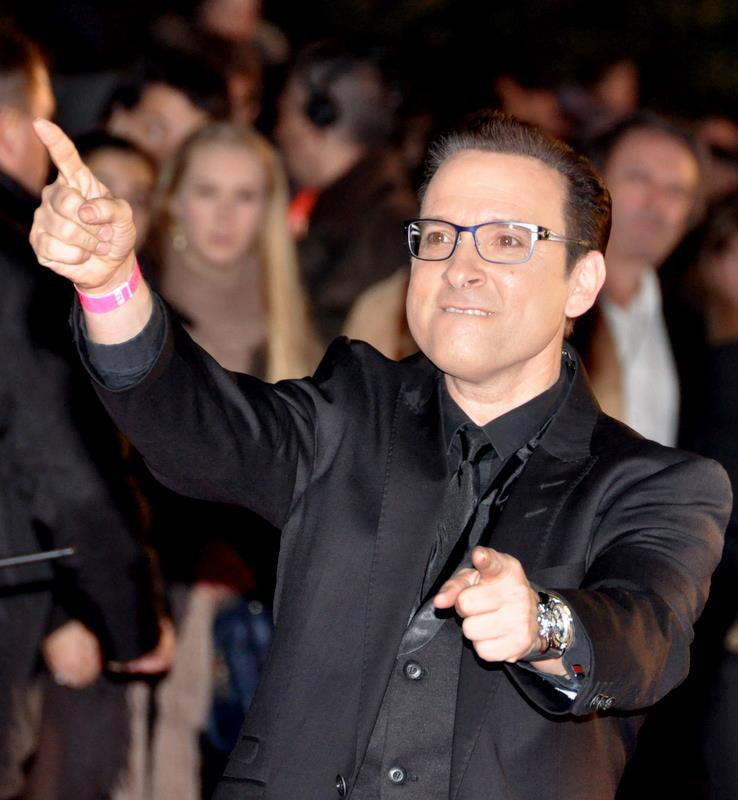
- Généreux at the NRJ Music Awards ceremony, January 2013.
- Born: December 25, 1962 (age 63); Saint-Hubert, Quebec, Canada
- Occupations: Choreographer, television personality, dancer, artist, costume designer
- Spouse: France Mousseau (m. 1987)
- Children: Jean-Francis (b. 1996); Francesca (b. 1999)
- Website: jeanmarcgenereux.com

Jean-Marc Généreux (/ʒɑ̃-maʁk ʒeneʁø/; born December 25, 1962) is a Canadian ballroom dance champion, choreographer and television personality from Longueuil, Quebec, Canada. He is most prominently known for his roles as judge and choreographer on the American and Canadian versions of So You Think You Can Dance, the French version of the hit television series Dancing with the Stars, and TVA’s hit dance competition series Révolution.

== Biography ==
Généreux met his partner and wife, France Mousseau, when they went to elementary school together. At a young age, he joined the dance school "École de Danse Loisirs Galaxia Inc." in Longueuil, Quebec, and was partnered with Mousseau when they were children. Généreux and Mousseau competed successfully as amateurs starting in 1977, and then professionally in 1986, in the Latin and 10-dance dancesport divisions, and retired in 1998.

They have been featured dancers on the PBS series Championship Ballroom Dancing and most recently, were guest choreographers on the Fox dance competition-reality show So You Think You Can Dance. They were also featured dancers on the big screen in the film Dance with Me, starring Vanessa L. Williams. Also, Généreux played a "Smarmy Old Man" in the ballroom dance film Shall We Dance, starring Jennifer Lopez.

Along with dancer/choreographer Tré Armstrong, Généreux has appeared as a Permanent Judge on CTV's So You Think You Can Dance Canada for the first four seasons. In 2010, he appeared in an episode in the tenth season of Degrassi as a Ballroom instructor for a remedial gym class. As of February 2011, he also appears as the Head Judge on TF1's Danse avec les stars, the French version of Dancing with the Stars

On the August 8, 2011, broadcast of So You Think You Can Dance Canada, Généreux announced the creation of his new dance shoe company, JMG Dance.

== Marriage and children ==
Généreux married his dance partner, France Mousseau, and they had their first child, Jean-Francis, in 1996, and their second, Francesca, in 1999. Their daughter, Francesca, suffers from Rett syndrome; Généreux and his wife work with others to raise awareness and money around this rare neurological condition. On Season 4 of So You Think You Can Dance, Généreux choreographed a Viennese waltz for Kherington Payne and Stephen "Twitch" Boss, a dance that he openly dedicated to daughter Francesca. Généreux also revealed in the second season auditions of So You Think You Can Dance Canada that his son had a vanishing twin. The couple now resides in Boucherville, Quebec where France stays permanently with the kids, unless she is needed to appear on one of the TV shows of which Jean-Marc is a part. The couple also design and make ballroom costumes for professional dancers.

== Awards ==
=== Amateur titles ===
- Canadian Province of Quebec Champions in Social Dancing, 1977 – 1979
- Canadian Basic and Standard Champions, International Style, 1980 – 1981
- 5-time Undefeated Canadian Latin and 10-dance Champions, 1982 – 1987
- 5-time Undefeated North American Latin and 10-dance Champions
- 3-time Peter Allan Award Latin Champions, England
- 4-time Latin Champions and Grand Champions, United States Ballroom Championships
- Winners, British Youth Latin American Championship, Blackpool

=== Professional titles ===
- 10-time Undefeated Canadian Latin Champions, 1987 – 1998
- 4-time Undefeated North American Champions
- 2-time Asian-Pacific Champions
- 2-time Winners, Challenge of the Continent
- Winners, Ohio Star Ball Open Latin Championship
- 3rd place, Overall Title, World 10-dance Championships
- Winners, Latin Title, World 10-dance Championships

== Filmography ==
=== Film ===
Year	Title	Role	Notes
1998	Dance With Me	Professional Latin Dance Finalist	joined France Mousseau
2004	Shall We Dance?	Smarmy Old Man	
2011	Funkytown		Choreographer
2013	La boîte à musique des Enfoirés	Himself	TV movie
2015	Joséphine, ange gardien	Sacha	TV series (1 episode)

=== Television ===
Year	Title	Role	Notes
2006–10	So You Think You Can Dance	Himself – Choreographer and Judge	14 episodes
2008–11	So You Think You Can Dance Canada	Himself – Choreographer and Judge	Permanent judge
2010	Degrassi: The Next Generation	Mr. Menard	Episode 10.15 and 10.16 "My Body Is A Cage: Part 1 & 2"
2011	Le Grand Journal (Canal+)	Himself	Interview
2011–2019	Danse avec les stars	Himself – Judge	Permanent Judge
2013	Le grand saut	Himself – Judge	
2018–present	Révolution	Himself – Judge	Permanent Judge

== See also ==
- DanceSport World Champions
- So You Think You Can Dance
  - Seasons 2, 3, 4 and 5
  - So You Think You Can Dance Canada
