= Samba (ballroom dance) =

Rhythmical partner dance

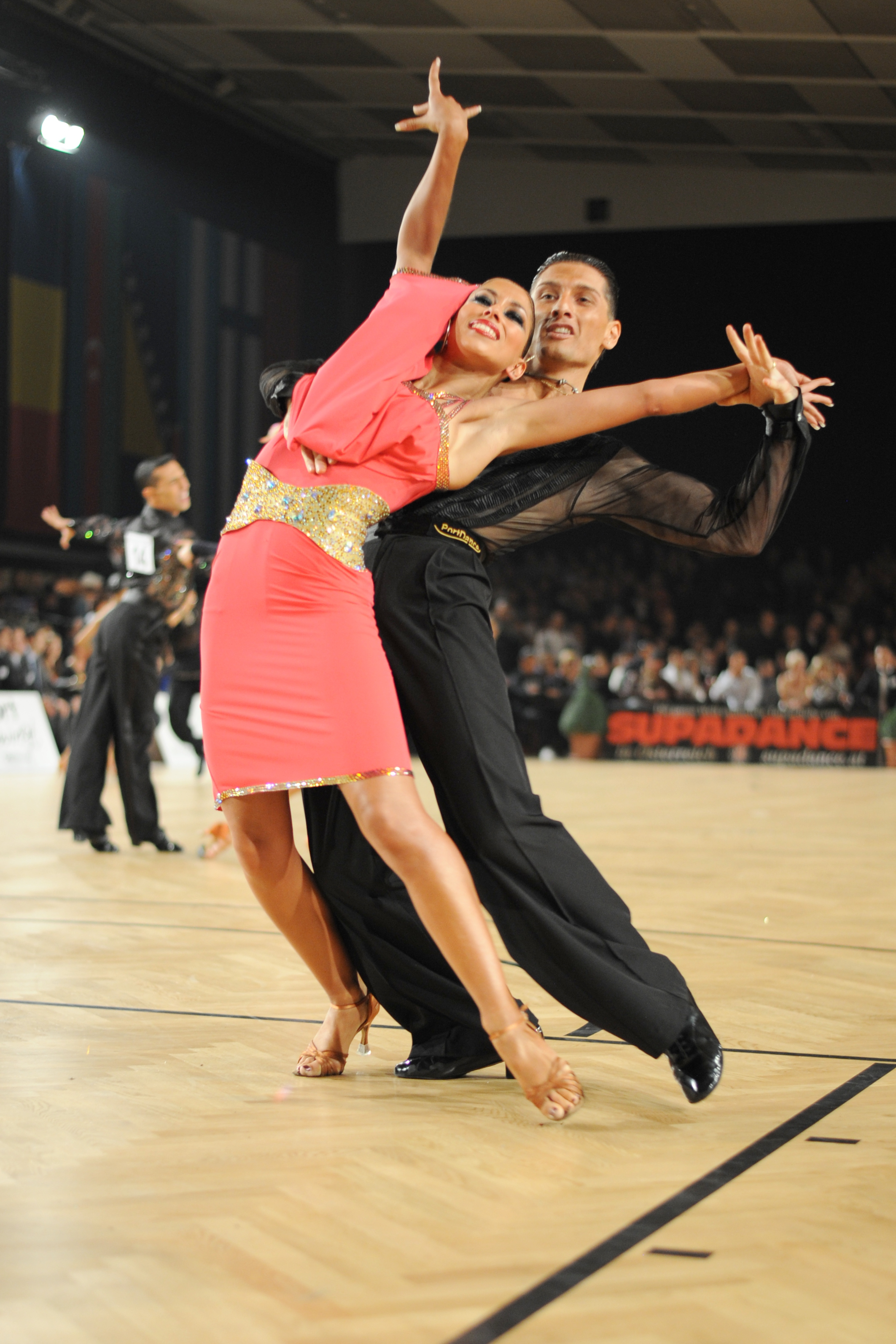
Samba Rolls dance figure

The international ballroom version of samba is one of the five official Latin American dances in international dancesport competitions. It in a lively, rhythmical dance which progresses counter-clockwise around the floor. It differs considerably from the original samba styles of Brazil; in particular, it differs from Samba de Gafieira, a partner type of Samba in that country.

== Music & Rhythm ==
The tempo of the Samba is 50-52 bars per minute with a time signature of 2/4.

Samba music can have a combination of timings and beat values including making use of half and quarter beats. Steps using quarter beats 'a' tend to make use of the samba bounce action which gives Samba its distinctive appearance.

Some examples of counts can be seen in the below table:

Count	Beat Value	Example Figure
1 a 2	3/4, 1/4, 1	Botafogo
1 & 2	1/2, 1/2, 1	Samba Locks
1 2 &	1, 1/2, 1/2	Natural Roll
1 2 3 or 1 a e	3/4,1/2, 3/4	Promenade Runs

When danced certain rhythms from the above, the dance features a bouncing action, with body elevation occurring at the last 1/4beat of the first bar.

== Technique ==
=== Samba Bounce ===
The Samba bounce is not a up-and-down bounce action but rather a knee action with little elevation..

The Samba bounce action is created by bending and straightening the knees. When the knees are bent the ankles compensate by lifting up and the hip (pelvis) goes forward.So there is little change in elevation.

== Syllabus ==
The World Dance Council uses the Burns Latn Tek books as the basis for their medallist and professional examinations and they have produced the following syllabus. For brevity, steps conducted in different positions have been excluded.

=== Student-Teacher Level ===
- Samba Basic
- Samba Whisks
- Samba Walks
- Samba Chasses
- Volta Spot Turns

=== Associate Level ===
- Stationary Samba Walks
- Corta Jaca
- Close Rocks
- Reverse Turn
- Botafogos
- Natural Roll

=== Licentiate Level ===
- Open Rocks
- Backward Rocks
- Plait
- Voltas

=== Fellowship Level ===
- Samba Locks
- Drop Volta
- Cruzado Locks
- Cruzado Walks
- Promenade to Counter-Promenade Runs
- Batucada
- Zig-Zag
- Carioca Runs
