= Sean Cheesman =

Canadian dancer and choreographer

Sean Cheesman is a Canadian dancer and choreographer, best known as a judge and choreographer for television dance competitions such as So You Think You Can Dance, So You Think You Can Dance Canada and Dirty Dancing: The Time of Your Life.

Born and raised in Calgary, Alberta to immigrant parents from Trinidad and Tobago, Cheesman was a figure skater in his youth before turning to dance.

Sean attended G.P. Vanier Jr. High and Crescent Heights High School in Calgary.

He studied dance in New York City at Alvin Ailey's dance school before landing his first job as a dancer in Michael Jackson's "Bad" video. He subsequently appeared in Vanessa Williams' video "The Right Stuff", and began working with her as a choreographer. He has also done choreography for Janet Jackson, Prince, Tina Turner, Whitney Houston, Queen Latifah and Britney Spears, and had a minor acting role in Houston's film The Bodyguard.

Cheesman is a patron of the Urdang Academy.
