= Tony Meredith =

- Born: May 24, 1958 (age 68); San Diego, California, US
- Occupation: Choreographer

Tony Meredith is an American professional ballroom dancer, choreographer and United States Professional Latin Champion.

== Biography ==
Tony Meredith, who is of Mexican and Samoan descent, was born in San Diego, California, discovered ballroom dancing after replying to a newspaper advertisement seeking dance teachers. His cousin taught him how to Hustle in the garage which ignited his love of dancing.

Meredith currently serves as the Dance Director at Danceville, U.S.A. in Columbus, Ohio. He is the co-organizer of Chicago Crystal Ball, Aloha Ball, and founded ICON DanceSport, a one-day industry awards event in Columbus, Ohio making its debut in October 2015.

== Dance career ==
Meredith met Melanie LaPatin in 1981. They formed a professional partnership, traveling the world representing the United States twelve times in the Professional World Latin-American Dance Championships, and eventually moved to New York City to train and open a studio. They had married in 1989, but divorced amicably following the opening of their studio.

With LaPatin, Meredith won over 100 first-place trophies and, in 1995, the professional Latin division of the U.S. Dancesport Championships. The couple retired from competitive dance in 1998.

== TV and film ==
Meredith has been behind the scenes as appearing in films, TV shows and Broadway, including feature film performances in Dance with Me, The Thomas Crown Affair, Let It Be Me and The Last Days of Disco. He has co-hosted seasons 1 and 2 of the PBS series America's Ballroom Challenge with Marilu Henner, and more recently, Meredith and LaPatin have appeared fairly regularly as guest choreographers on the Fox dance competition reality show So You Think You Can Dance. Meredith just finished filming Season 5 of the PBS series America's Ballroom Challenge with Mary Murphy.

== Achievements ==
- 1995 - U.S. National Professional Latin Champion with Melanie LaPatin
