= Tré Armstrong =

Canadian dancer and actress

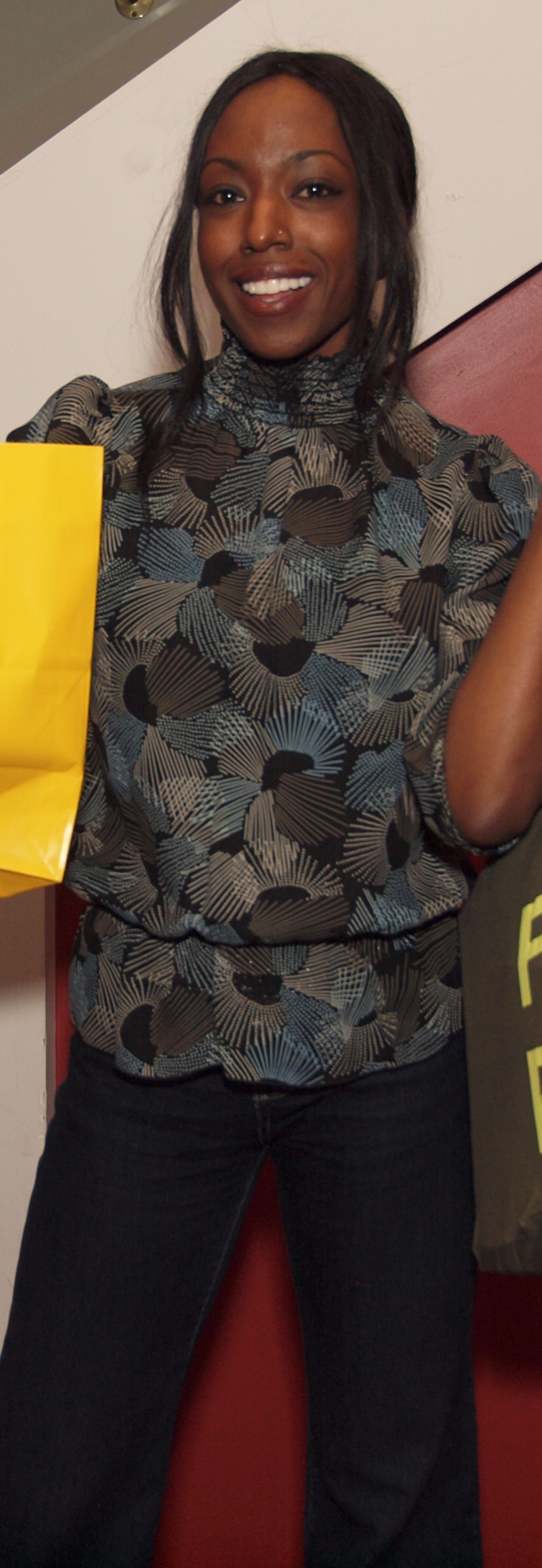
- Armstrong in November 2010
- Born: August 17, 1978 (age 48)
- Other names: • Tracey "Tre" Armstrong • Tracey Armstrong
- Citizenship: Canada
- Occupations: Choreographer, dancer

Tré Armstrong (born August 17, 1978) is a Canadian dancer, choreographer, and actress.

== Early life and education ==
Born in Toronto, Armstrong's family lived in Parkdale until she was four. Her early dance training at age five in ballet, jazz, and tap dance techniques is what has shaped her into who she is today.

== Career ==
Armstrong has appeared on the television programs Top of the Pops, Canadian Idol, 106 & Park, and the MTV Video Music Awards. Celebrities she has worked with include Sean Combs, Hilary Duff, Missy Elliott, Jay-Z, Rihanna, and Kreesha Turner. Armstrong has performed in multiple feature films, award shows, reality-based television shows, and all across the United States, Canada, St. Kitts, Australia, New Zealand, Europe, and Japan. She is also one of the judges on So You Think You Can Dance Canada, and is in six episodes of The Next Step.

=== Choreography ===
- A Raisin in the Sun (ABC 2008 MOW) – starring Sean Combs, Phylicia Rashad, Sanaa Lathan, Audra McDonald, John Stamos
- Turn the Beat Around
- Repo! The Genetic Opera
- Vibe Awards
- Canadian Idol
- national commercials

=== Filmography ===
Armstrong was featured in the documentary film Breakin' In: The Making of a Hip Hop Dancer (2005), which highlighted her as one of Canada's top rising stars.

- How She Move
- Save the Last Dance 2
- Repo! The Genetic Opera
- Breakin' In: The Making of a Hip Hop Dancer
- The Next Step Season 2. Nationals presenter.
- Confessions of a Teenage Drama Queen
- Honey
- Shall We Dance?

== See also ==
- List of Canadian actors
- List of choreographers
- List of dancers
