= Christina Perri discography =

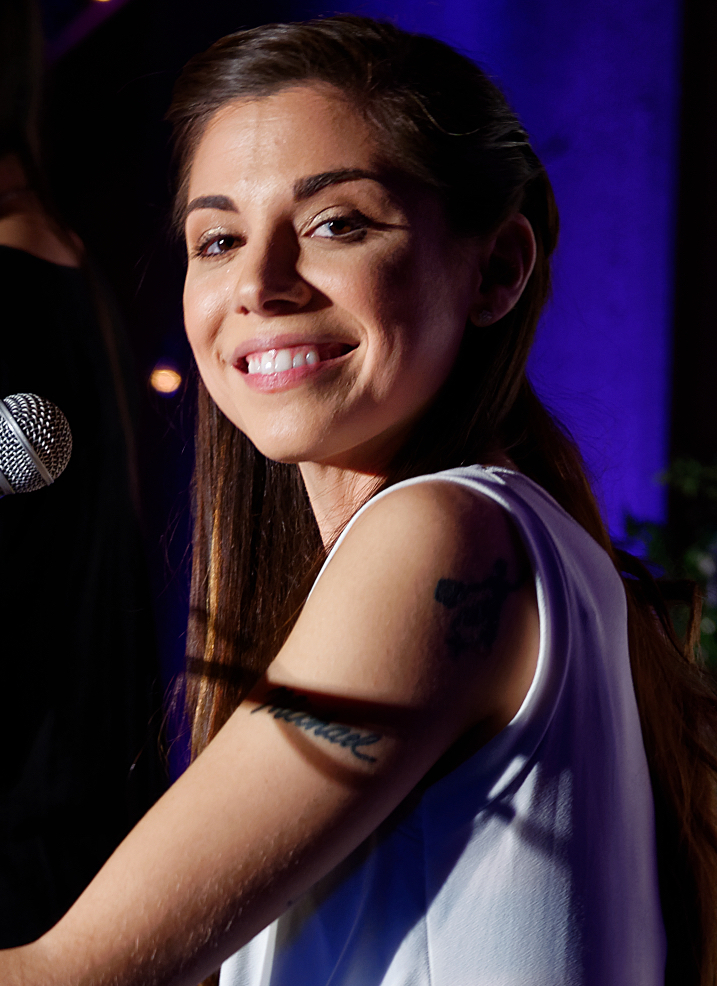
- Perri in 2016
- Studio albums: 7
- Extended plays: 3
- Singles: 11
- Music videos: 13
- Promotional singles: 7
- Lyric videos: 4

American singer-songwriter and musician Christina Perri has released six studio albums, three extended plays, eleven singles, seven promotional singles, and thirteen music videos.

Perri's debut single, "Jar of Hearts", was released independently in June 2010 and charted in North America following exposure on So You Think You Can Dance. She then signed with Atlantic Records in July 2010 and released her debut studio album, Lovestrong in May 2011. Subsequent singles, "Arms" and "Distance", failed to replicate their predecessor's mainstream success, but did both chart in the top twenty of the Billboard Adult Pop Songs chart. In 2011, Perri contributed the single A Thousand Years to the soundtrack album to the hit film, The Twilight Saga: Breaking Dawn – Part 1; the song charted well internationally and domestically, and being certified Diamond by RIAA.

Head or Heart was released in March 2014 as Perri's second studio album. Its lead single, "Human", was a moderate hit, reaching the top 40 of the Billboard Hot 100 and being certified 3× Platinum by RIAA. Follow-up singles, "Burning Gold" and "The Words" failed to the enter the Hot 100 and only charted in the 20s on the Adult Pop chart.

== Studio albums ==
Title	Details	Peak chart positions										Certifications
Title	Details	US	AUS	AUT	CAN	FIN	GER	IRE	NZ	SWI	UK	Certifications
Lovestrong	Released: May 10, 2011; Label: Atlantic; Formats: CD, digital download	4	5	7	9	25	8	5	27	6	9	RIAA: Platinum; ARIA: Gold; BPI: Gold; IRMA: Platinum; RMNZ: Gold
Head or Heart	Released: April 1, 2014; Label: Atlantic; Formats: CD, digital download	4	23	41	6	—	72	14	—	16	8	RIAA: Gold
Songs for Carmella: Lullabies & Sing-a-Longs	Released: January 17, 2019; Label: Atlantic; Formats: CD, digital download	— (Note: Songs for Carmella: Lullabies & Sing-a-Longs did not enter the Billboard 200, but peaked at number 90 on the Top Current Album Sales chart.)	—	—	—	—	—	—	—	—	—	
Songs for Rosie	Released: November 24, 2021; Label: Atlantic; Formats: CD, digital download	—	—	—	—	—	—	—	—	—	—	
A Lighter Shade of Blue	Released: July 15, 2022; Label: Elektra; Formats: CD, Digital download, streaming	— (Note: A Lighter Shade of Blue did not enter the Billboard 200, but peaked at number 83 on the Top Current Album Sales chart.)	—	—	—	—	—	—	—	—	—	
Songs for Pixie	Released: October 20, 2023; Label: Elektra; Formats: CD, digital download	—	—	—	—	—	—	—	—	—	—	
Songs for Christmas	Released: November 3, 2023; Label: Elektra; Formats: CD, digital download	—	—	—	—	—	—	—	—	—	—	
"—" denotes a recording that did not chart or was not released in that territory.

== Extended plays ==
Title	Details	Peak chart positions		
Title	Details	US	US Heat	US Hol.
The Ocean Way Sessions	Released: November 9, 2010; Label: Atlantic; Formats: CD, digital download	144	1	—
The Karaoke Collection	Released: May 10, 2011; Label: Atlantic; Formats: Digital download	—	—	—
A Very Merry Perri Christmas	Released: October 16, 2012; Re-released (A Very Merry Perri Christmas (extra presents)): November 22, 2019; Label: Atlantic; Formats: CD, digital download	98	—	4
"—" denotes a recording that did not chart or was not released in that territory.

== Singles ==
=== As lead artist ===
Title	Year	Peak chart positions										Certifications	Album
Title	Year	US	US Adult	AUS	AUT	CAN	FIN	GER	IRL	NZ	UK	Certifications	Album
"Jar of Hearts"	2010	17	4	2	3	21	4	5	2	28	4	RIAA: 7× Platinum; ARIA: 3× Platinum; BPI: 3× Platinum; BVMI: Platinum; IFPI AUT: Platinum; IFPI SWI: 2× Platinum; MC: 2× Platinum; IRMA: 2× Platinum; RMNZ: 2× Platinum	Lovestrong
"Arms"	2011	94	13	—	—	—	—	—	—	—	194	RIAA: Platinum	Lovestrong
"A Thousand Years"	2011	31	7	13	19	70	19	—	7	11	11	RIAA: 13× Platinum; ARIA: 7× Platinum; BPI: 5× Platinum; BVMI: 3× Gold; IRMA: Gold; MC: Platinum; RMNZ: 6× Platinum	The Twilight Saga: Breaking Dawn – Part 1
"Distance" (featuring Jason Mraz)	2012	—	20	—	—	—	—	—	—	—	—	RIAA: Gold	Lovestrong
"A Thousand Years, Pt. 2" (featuring Steve Kazee)	2012	53	—	39	—	40	—	26	—	31	—	RIAA: Gold	The Twilight Saga: Breaking Dawn – Part 2
"Human"	2013	31	10	39	42	71	—	59	24	—	14	RIAA: 3× Platinum; ARIA: Platinum; BPI: Platinum; MC: Platinum; RMNZ: Platinum	Head or Heart
"Burning Gold"	2014	—	25	—	—	—	—	—	—	—	—		Head or Heart
"The Words"	2015	—	29	—	—	—	—	—	—	—	—		Head or Heart
"Tiny Victories"	2019	—	—	—	—	—	—	—	—	—	—		A Lighter Shade of Blue
"Jar of Hearts" (10th anniversary acoustic)	2020	—	—	—	—	—	—	—	—	—	—		Non-album single
"Merry Christmas Darling"	2021	—	—	—	—	—	—	—	—	—	—		A Very Merry Perri Christmas (Extra Presents)
"Evergone"	2022	—	35	—	—	—	—	—	—	—	—		A Lighter Shade of Blue
"Mothers"	2022	—	—	—	—	—	—	—	—	—	—		A Lighter Shade of Blue
"Home"	2022	—	—	—	—	—	—	—	—	—	—		A Lighter Shade of Blue
"Kid at Christmas" (with Calum Scott)	2024	—	—	—	—	—	—	—	—	—	—		Non-album single
"—" denotes a recording that did not chart or was not released in that territory.

=== Promotional singles ===
Title	Year	Peak chart positions			Album
Title	Year	US Bubbling	US Holiday Digital	US Pop Digital	Album
"The Lonely"	2011	2	—	—	Lovestrong
"Penguin"	2011	—	—	—	Lovestrong
"Tragedy"	2011	—	—	—	Lovestrong
"Bluebird"	2011	—	—	—	Lovestrong
"Something About December"	2012	—	4	—	A Very Merry Perri Christmas
"I Believe"	2013	—	—	—	Head or Heart
"I Don't Wanna Break"	2014	—	—	40	Head or Heart
"—" denotes a recording that did not chart or was not released in that territory.

== Other certified songs ==
Title	Year	Certifications	Album
"You Are My Sunshine"	2019	RIAA: Platinum; BPI: Silver; RMNZ: Gold	Songs for Carmella: Lullabies & Sing-a-Longs

== Other appearances ==
List of guest appearances, showing other performer(s), year released, and album name
Title	Year	Other artist(s)	Album
"If I Could Turn Back Time"	2014	—N/a	Sounds of the 80s
"Gold"	2015	Jamie Scott	My Hurricane
"All That Matters"	2015	—N/a	Finding Neverland: The Album
"Hero"	2016	Cash Cash	Blood, Sweat & 3 Years
"Brave Enough"	2016	Lindsey Stirling	Brave Enough
"White Christmas"	2018	Ingrid Michaelson	Songs for the Season
"Simple Things"	2019	Alexander Cardinale	Non-album single
"I Like Tiny Things"	2019	Cody, Heart, Mr. Primm, Scatter	Helpsters, Vol. 1 (Apple TV+ Original Series Soundtrack)
"It's A Small World"	2020	—N/a	At home with the kids
"Rather Be"	2022	Luke Sital-Singh	Dressing Like a Stranger

== Music videos ==
Title	Year	Director
"Jar of Hearts"	2010	Jay Martin
"Arms"	2011	Sarah Chatfield
"A Thousand Years"	2011	Jay Martin
"Distance"	2012	Elliott Sellers
"Something About December"	2012	Elliott Sellers
"Happy Xmas (War Is Over)"	2012	—N/a
"Human"	2014	Elliott Sellers
"Burning Gold"	2014	Jay Martin
"The Words"	2015	Iouri Philippe Paillé
"You Mean the Whole Wide World to Me"	2018	Austin Gomez, Tori Balena
"A Thousand Years" (lullaby version)	2019	Christina Perri
"Tiny Victories"	2019	Firethorne Films
"Jar of Hearts" (10th anniversary acoustic)	2020	Mario Costabile
"Evergone"	2022	Grant Spanier
"Kid at Christmas" (with Calum Scott)	2024	—N/a
