= Adrianne Gonzalez =

American singer-songwriter (born 1977)

Adrianne E. Gonzalez
- Also known as: Adrianne, AG
- Born: 1977 (age 48–49); Miami, Florida, U.S.
- Genres: Alternative rock, cinematic music, pop music
- Occupations: Songwriter; music producer; composer; mix engineer
- Instruments: Piano, guitar
- Years active: 1998–present
- Website: www.byaginc.com

Adrianne E. Gonzalez (born 1977), also known as AG, is an American songwriter, producer, composer, and mix engineer.

== Early life and education ==
Gonzalez was born and raised in Miami, where she was a chorister and taught herself piano and guitar, taking up the latter at seventeen.

She has said of her beginnings:

I was in choir from a very early age. It was kind of my life since I was about eight. But I didn't know what that would mean for me when I was an adult, or as a career. I didn't even know what a career was in high school. But when I was in high school I heard the Indigo Girls for the first time. And I was like, "Okay! I wanna do that." It was definitely a pivotal moment. The first time I heard "Love Will Come to You", that's when I knew.

She went on to obtain a degree in music production and engineering from Boston's Berklee College of Music before moving to Los Angeles, where she is now based.

== Career ==
Gonzalez won the USA Songwriting Competition Grand Prize in 1999 for "Say 'em Strong"; the Boston Music Award for Best New Singer-Songwriter in 2000; and a SESAC Television and Film Composers Award in 2009 for her contribution to Guiding Light. She has also been a finalist in the Coca-Cola New Music Awards and the Lilith Fair Talent Search.

Gonzalez previously maintained a busy performance and recording schedule. She has supported Jeff Buckley, Jackson Browne, and Bonnie Raitt, among others, and released seven albums and two EPs under her own names (Adrianne until 2011, AG since 2012). In 2008, she joined with Kyler England, Rob Giles, and Gabriel Mann to form The Rescues. She now devotes her time to songwriting, composing, and producing songs with and for other artists and songwriters.

Soon after settling in Los Angeles, Gonzalez signed a publishing deal with Lionel Conway at the Mosaic Media Group. She is now published by the Kobalt Music Group. Between the ASCAP and SESAC databases she is listed as the author or co-author of more than 500 songs. AG's catalogue has generated over 340 million streams and 390 million views on Youtube to date.

AG has collaborated with songwriters including Christina Perri, MILCK, Ciara, Natalie Imbruglia, KYGO, Bonnie McKee, and Aloe Blacc. Her work has amassed features in a long list of television shows One Tree Hill (The CW), Grey's Anatomy (ABC), Lucifer (Fox), Vida (STARZ), The Today Show (NBC), Cloak and Dagger (Freeform), Riverdale (The CW), and The Chilling Adventures of Sabrina (Netflix)), trailers and promos (Dolittle (Universal Pictures), The Handmaid's Tale (Hulu), A Beautiful Day In The Neighborhood (Sony Pictures), The Highwaymen (Netflix), League of Legends (Riot Games)), ad campaigns for brands like Starbucks, Ford, P&G, Cadillac, and Guess, and films (Hobbs and Shaw (Universal Pictures), The Last Witch Hunter (Lionsgate), and FOSTER (HBO)). AG co-wrote and produced Christina Perri's 2019 single 'Tiny Victories' for HBO's 'FOSTER', a documentary about the foster care system in Los Angeles, CA.

== Notable credits ==
2021 Golden Trailer Award Winner
Samsung Galaxy (National AD Campaign)
Verizon (National AD Campaign)
The Morning Show - Trailer (Apple TV+)
Fast And Furious 9 - In Film (Universal)
9-1-1 Promo (FOX)
A Beautiful Day In The Neighborhood - Trailer (Sony Pictures)
A Fall From Grace - Trailer (Netflix)
All American - Promo (The CW)
Always Be My Maybe - Trailer (Netflix)
American Gods Season 2 Trailer (Starz)
Beautiful Boy - Trailer / Featurette (Amazon)
Brand Campaign 2017 – Promo (HBO)
Brand Campaign 2018 – Promo (HBO)
Cadillac – Super Bowl/WW Ad Campaign
Coca-Cola Korea - National Ad Campaign
Dark Souls III – Trailer
Dolittle - Trailer (Universal)
Empire – Promo (FOX)
Escape The Night - Trailer/Promo (YouTube Red)
Fast And Furious Presents: Hobbs and Shaw (Universal)
Ford - National Ad Campaign
FOSTER (HBO)
Full Frontal with Samantha Bee – New Season Promo
Goliath – Trailer (Amazon)
Guess – National Ad Campaign
Inside Man 2 (Universal)
Last Witch Hunter – Trailer; End Title Song (Lionsgate)
League of Legends - Cinematic Trailer
Legacies - Promo (The CW)
Lucifer – Promo (FOX)
Marco Polo – Trailer (NETFLIX)
Midnight Texas – Promo (NBC)
New Amsterdam - Promo (NBC)
O2 Sports - National Ad Campaign
Olympics/PG&E - WW Ad Campaign
Planned Parenthood – National Campaign
Power - Promo (Starz)
Promising Young Women - Trailer (Focus Features)
Pure - Promo (WGN)
Quaker Oats – National Ad Campaign
Rise – Promo (NBC)
Samantha Bee – Promo (TBS)
Shoe Carnival – National Ad Campaign
Starbucks – National Ad Campaign
State of Decay 2: Heartland - Trailer (Xbox)
Taken – Trailer (NBC)
The Family – Promo (ABC)
The Gifted – Promo (FOX)
The Handmaids Tale - Trailer (Hulu)
The Highwaymen - Trailer (Netflix)
The Leftovers – Trailer (HBO)
The Magicians – Promo (SyFy)
The Price On Our Lives - National Ad Campaign *Golden Lion Award*
The Prodigal Son - Trailer (Netflix)
The Red Line - Trailer (CBS)
To All The Boys I've Loved Before - Trailer (NETFLIX)
Today Show – Artist live performance (NBC)
True Crime Documentaries - Promo (HBO)
Turquoise Fever - Promo (INSP)
UFC 246: McGregor vs Cowboy - The Showdown - Promo (UFC)
Undercurrent - Promo (CJZ AUS)
Vampire Diaries – Comic-Con Trailer (CW)
Velvet Buzzsaw - Netflix Film
Vida – Trailer (STARZ)
Wizard of Lies – Promo (HBO)
YouTube – Women's Day Campaign
YouTube Women's Day – Promo Campaign

== Discography ==
=== Producer and/or writer ===
- All Fall Down – Garrison Starr (2013) Single
- Discover: Songs Of The Rolling Stones Vol. 2 - Various Artists (2018) EP
- (I Can't Get No) Satisfaction – Devvon Terrell (2018) Single
- Say It Now – nilu (2019) Single
- Humankind – Reuben And The Dark (2019) Single
- My Love Will Never Die – Claire Wydham (2019) Single
- Legendz – Devvon Terrlee (2019) Single
- What A Wonderful World – Reuben And the Dark (2019) Single
- Bad Feeling – Reuben And The Dark (2019) Single
- I'm Comin Home – Aloe Blacc (2019) Single and Instrumental version
- Tiny Victories – Christina Perri (From HBO's 'FOSTER')(2019) Single

=== Artist ===
==== Adrianne ====
- For Adeline (1998 / 2000)
- 10,000 Stones (2004)
- Down to This (2005)
- Sweet Mistake (2006)
- Burn Me Up (2008)
- You Me Lonely (2009)
- Me After You (2012)

==== Extended plays ====
- Boy Songs (2007)
- Reimagine: The Beatles by AG (2012)

==== AG ====
===== Albums =====
- Terrible Thing (2019)

===== Singles =====
- "Shelter You" (2014)

=== The Rescues ===
==== Albums ====
- Crazy Ever After (2008)
- Let Loose the Horses (2010)
- Blah Blah Love and War (2013)
- The Rescues (2017)

==== Extended plays ====
- The Rescues (2010)

==== Singles ====
- "All That I Want for Christmas (Is to Give My Love Away)" (2009)
- "Teenage Dream" (2010)
- "Hold On" (2019)
