= Human (Christina Perri song) =

2013 single by Christina Perri

Single by Christina Perri

from the album Head or Heart
- Released: November 18, 2013
- Recorded: 2013
- Studio: Westlake Recording Studios (Los Angeles, CA); Conway Recording Studios (Los Angeles, CA); Ocean Way Recording (Los Angeles, CA)
- Genre: Pop
- Length: 4:10
- Label: Atlantic
- Songwriters: Christina Perri; Martin Johnson
- Producer: Martin Johnson

Christina Perri singles chronology
"Distance" (2012)	"Human" (2013)	"Burning Gold" (2014)

Music video
- "Human" on YouTube

"Human" is a song recorded by American singer-songwriter Christina Perri for her second studio album, Head or Heart (2014). The song was written by Perri and Martin Johnson, who also produced the song. It was released on November 18, 2013, as the lead single for the album. Released to generally positive reviews, "Human" has since become a Top 10 Adult Pop hit in the United States, as well as her third and final top 40 entry on the Billboard Hot 100. It also reached the top 40 in Australia, Ireland, Spain, Switzerland, and the United Kingdom. It was certified Platinum by RIAA in June 2014.

== Background ==
"Human" was written by Perri and Martin Johnson in April 2013, and was produced by Martin Johnson. The song was written at the end of a long session of song-writing, and originally Perri wasn't sure if the song would be in the album because she felt it was too personal, but because of the positive reactions to the song, she decided to put in the album and chose it as the lead single. The song was released on iTunes on November 18, 2013, and Perri debuted the song with a performance on The Queen Latifah Show the same day. "Human" impacted American hot adult contemporary radio on December 9, 2013, and contemporary hit radio a day later.

== Composition ==
Like previous singles "Jar of Hearts" and "Arms", "Human" is largely built around a piano melody and showcases her voice. It is a pop power ballad written in key A^{b} major, and features a strong build-up towards the chorus. The song features a string arrangement by notable arranger David Campbell. Critics have compared Perri's honest, heart-on-her-sleeve songwriting to that of Taylor Swift. Lyrically, "Human" uses relatable yet specific details to describe the vulnerability of being human. The verses find Perri musing the things she would do for love, yet as she sings in the chorus, "I'm only human / And I bleed when I fall down."

== Critical reception ==
"Human" was acclaimed by critics. Sam Lansky of Idolator applauded the song for being "properly dramatic" in its approach, noting that Perri "[sings] her heart out over triumphant production," resulting in what he described as an "epic and radio-friendly" ballad. Amy Sciarretto of PopCrush responded positively to the confessional nature of the lyrics, as well as Perri's "angelic" voice, of which she "shows a wider range than ever" in her delivery. She rated the song 3.5 stars out of 5. Robert Copsey of Digital Spy described it as a "gothic-tinged" ballad that is "as satisfying as it comes", and rated it three stars out of five.

== Commercial performance ==
On its week of release, the song debuted on the Billboard Bubbling Under Hot 100 Singles chart at No. 1. It entered the Billboard Hot 100 chart at No. 90 for the chart dated February 22, 2014, and peaked at No. 31 on the Hot 100 for the chart dated May 3, 2014. The song debuted on at No. 71 on the Canadian Hot 100 chart on its week of release.

== Music video ==
The official music video for "Human" premiered on January 3, 2014 and was uploaded to Perri's YouTube account the following day. The video was directed by Elliott Sellers (former drummer of American death metal band, Job for a Cowboy) and features Perri as a robot sitting in a white room, with close-ups of the mechanics working inside of her body. As Perri begins to move, various body parts are shown to be bionic. Towards the end of the video, Perri begins to transform from a machine into a human as sparks fall behind her; her tattoos reappear as a symbol of her individuality and her robotic heart begins to pump fluid around her body.

== Charts ==
=== Weekly charts ===
"Human" weekly chart performance
Chart (2013–14)	Peak position
Australia (ARIA)	39
Austria (Ö3 Austria Top 40)	42
Canada Hot 100 (Billboard)	71
Germany (GfK)	59
Ireland (IRMA)	24
Scottish Singles Sales (Official Charts)	17
Slovakia Airplay (ČNS IFPI)	13
Spain (Promusicae)	23
Switzerland (Schweizer Hitparade)	14
UK Singles (Official Charts)	14
US Billboard Hot 100	31
US Adult Contemporary (Billboard)	16
US Adult Pop Airplay (Billboard)	10
US Dance Club Songs (Billboard)	16
US Pop Airplay (Billboard)	31

=== Year-end charts ===
"Human" year-end chart performance
Chart (2014)	Position
US Adult Contemporary (Billboard)	44
US Adult Pop Airplay (Billboard)	33

== Certifications ==
"Human" certifications
Region	Certification	Certified units/sales
Australia (ARIA)	Platinum	70,000^{‡}
Canada (Music Canada)	Platinum	80,000^{*}
Denmark (IFPI Danmark)	Gold	45,000^{‡}
New Zealand (RMNZ)	Platinum	30,000^{‡}
Spain (Promusicae)	Gold	30,000^{‡}
United Kingdom (BPI)	Platinum	600,000^{‡}
United States (RIAA)	3× Platinum	1,000,000
^{*} Sales figures based on certification alone.^{‡} Sales+streaming figures based on certification alone.

== Release history ==
"Human" release history
Region	Date	Format	Label	Ref.
Canada	November 18, 2013	Digital download	Atlantic	
United States	November 18, 2013	Digital download	Atlantic	
United States	December 9, 2013	Hot / Modern / AC radio	Atlantic; RRP	
United States	December 10, 2013	Contemporary hit radio	Atlantic; RRP	
United Kingdom	March 10, 2014	Digital download	Atlantic	
