= A Lighter Shade of Blue =

2022 studio album by Christina Perri

Studio album by Christina Perri
- Released: July 15, 2022
- Recorded: 2016–2020
- Length: 47:20
- Label: Elektra
- Producer: Adrianne Gonzalez; David Hodges; Jenn Decilveo

Christina Perri chronology
Songs for Rosie (2021)	A Lighter Shade of Blue (2022)	Songs for Pixie (2023)

Singles from A Lighter Shade of Blue
- 1. "Evergone" Released: March 24, 2022; 2. "Mothers" Released: May 5, 2022; 3. "Home" Released: June 23, 2022

A Lighter Shade of Blue is the fifth studio album by American singer-songwriter Christina Perri. It was released on July 15, 2022, via Elektra Records, and described as her third pop album. Marking her first pop release in nearly eight years, the album reflects on themes of grief, motherhood, and resilience, inspired in part by the loss of her daughter Rosie and her experiences as a new mother. The record was developed over six years and recorded during the COVID-19 pandemic while Perri was pregnant, blending folk-rock and jazz influences with a melancholic yet intimate tone.

A Lighter Shade of Blue was supported by three singles, "Evergone", "Mothers", and "Home", as well as a series of intimate live performances. It received generally favorable reviews, with critics noting its emotional depth and cohesive sound, though some cited a lack of variety.

== Background ==
Perri honored her late daughter Rosie with a lullaby album titled Songs for Rosie, stating that she felt it "was the best way to honor" her. She said, "when she passed away, I felt like the songs took on a different meaning, but they're still my song choices for her". The singer later announced that her next studio album, A Light Shade of Blue, would be released on June 24, 2022.

"A Light Shade of Blue album has been a long time coming, and getting to perform songs from it in an intimate setting will be really special."

In an interview with E! News, Perri explained that one of the songs on the album was written with her longtime collaborator Amy Wadge as "a bit of a love letter to moms having a hard time". Reflecting on her own experience as a new mother to her daughter Carmella, she shared, "There are so many things you can't prepare for and your heart feels like it breaks over and over and over. We get so, so strong, but for a little while, we are very fragile". She added that the song was meant to make mothers feel "seen and held", particularly on Mother's Day. On June 9, Perri announced through her social media that the album's release date had been moved up to July 15.

Perri also revealed that the album had been in development for nearly six years, with songs written between 2016 and 2020. She described it as an accumulation of personal milestones—including marriage, four pregnancies, and moving between cities—alongside broader events like the COVID-19 pandemic. Much of the album was recorded during the summer of 2020, while she was seven months pregnant, working with producer Jenn Decilveo in a makeshift studio in New Jersey. Despite the album's melancholic tone, Perri emphasized that the recording process was intimate and joyful, infused with collaboration, refuge from the outside world, and a sense of togetherness.

== Composition ==
According to PopMatters, while her second studio album Head or Heart (2014) experimented with mid-2010s pop sensibilities, A Light Shade of Blue draws from a more refined palette of folk-rock and jazz influences.

== Promotion ==
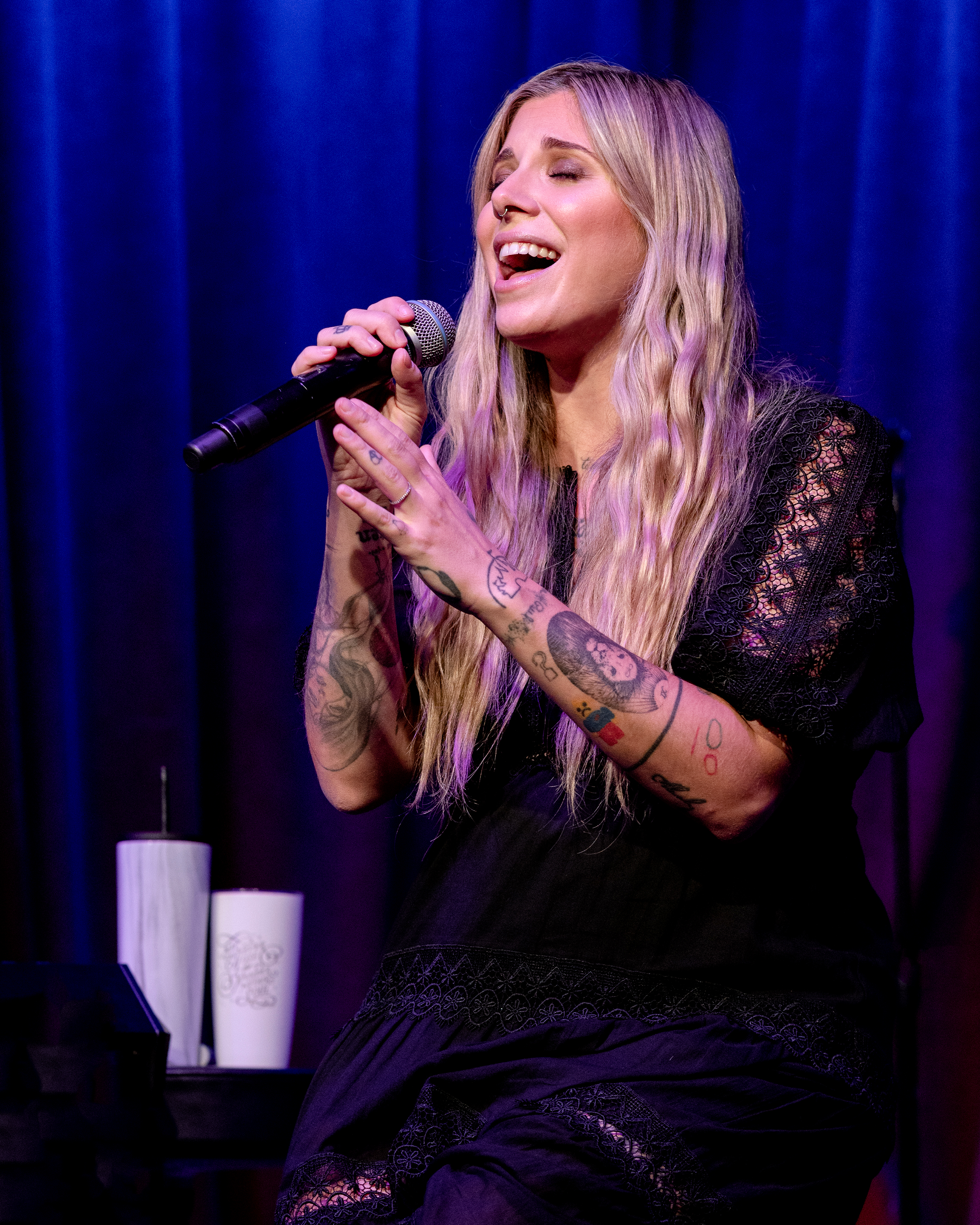
Perri performing at Hotel Café

To support A Lighter Shade of Blue, Perri scheduled appearances at Hotel Café in Los Angeles, Bowery Ballroom in New York City, and World Cafe in Philadelphia in the days following the album's release.

=== Singles ===
Perri debuted the album's lead single, "Evergone", on March 24, 2022. "Mothers" was chosen as the next single, released on May 5 alongside the announcement of the album's release. A Lighter Shade of Blue's third and final single was "Home", released on June 23.

== Critical reception ==
Professional ratings
Review scores
Source	Rating
Gigwise	6/10 stars
PopMatters	8/10

Gigwise described A Light Shade of Blue as an album that "strikes a largely melancholic tone", noting that this emotional territory is familiar for Perri, whose signature song is "a piano ballad in C minor about her refusing to reconnect with an old boyfriend". The review acknowledged that it may feel heavy at times but highlighted its "tender, touching moments". While not considered a groundbreaking release, the album was seen as one that "is sure to please Perri's fans". Entertainment Focus found the album "solid enough," praising the beauty and intimacy of the songs, but noted that its "lack of variety" and "downtempo" nature made it less compelling for repeat listens.

== Track listing ==
A Lighter Shade of Blue track listing
No.	Title	Writer(s)	Producer(s)	Length
1.	"Surrender"	Christina Perri; AG; Aijia Grammer; Rachel Platten	Jennifer Decilveo; AG^{[a]}	2:51
2.	"Hurt"	Perri; Decilveo; Maureen 'Mozella' McDonald; Wendy Wang		3:47
3.	"Evergone"	Perri; Jason Bell; Decilveo; Jordan Miller		3:30
4.	"Back in Time" (featuring Ben Rector)	Perri; David Hodges		3:57
5.	"Home"	Perri; Amy Wadge; Decilveo		3:40
6.	"People Like You"	Perri; Wadge; Decilveo		3:33
7.	"Fever"	Perri; Dan Wilson; Decilveo		3:31
8.	"Blue"	Perri; Luke Sital-Singh		3:34
9.	"I Do It for You"	Perri; AG	Decilveo; AG^{[v]}	2:55
10.	"Mothers"	Perri; Wadge; Hodges	Hodges	2:55
11.	"Fighter"	Perri; Decilveo		3:46
12.	"Tiny Victories"	Perri; Adrianne Gonzalez		3:21
13.	"Time of Our Lives"	Perri; Wadge; Decilveo		3:24
14.	"Rose in the Rain"	Perri; Daniel Tashian; Ian Fitchuk; Decilveo		2:36
Total length:				47:20

=== Notes ===
- All songs were produced by Jennifer Decilveo, except where noted.
- ^{^[a]} signifies additional producer.
- ^{^[v]} signifies vocal producer.

== Personnel ==
Credits were adapted from AllMusic.

- Adrianne Gonzalez – additional production, composer, piano, producer, vocal producer
- Aijia Grammer – composer
- Amy Wadge – composer
- Andrew Lappin – engineer
- Anna Chandler – cover art, layout
- Ben Rector – featured artist
- Carmella Costabile – background vocals
- Christina Perri – composer, lead vocals, background vocals
- Dan Wilson – composer
- Daniel Tashian – composer
- David Hodges – composer, engineer, piano, producer
- David Levita – guitar
- Gena Johnson – engineer
- Ian Fitchuk – composer, piano
- Jason Merris Bell – composer
- Jenn Decilveo – composer, drum programming, engineer, executive producer, mellotron, piano, producer, synthesizer
- Jesse McGinty – horn
- Joe Zook – mixing
- Jordan Rand Miller – composer
- Lauren Dunn – photography
- Luke Sital-Singh – composer, background vocals, Wurlitzer
- Maureen McDonald – composer
- Michelle Mancini – mastering
- Mike Rachlin – assistant engineer
- Nicky Costabile – vocal arrangement, vocal producer, background vocals
- Parker Genoway – creative director
- Patrick Kelly – bass
- Pete Ganbarg – Arabesque
- Rachel Platten – composer
- Sam Ks – drums
- Wendy Wang – composer
- Whakaio Taahi – engineer, vocal producer

== Charts ==
List of weekly chart positions
Chart (2022)	Peak position
UK Album Downloads (OCC)	49
UK Albums Sales (OCC)	85
