= Stacey Tookey =

Canadian choreographer and dancer (born 1976)

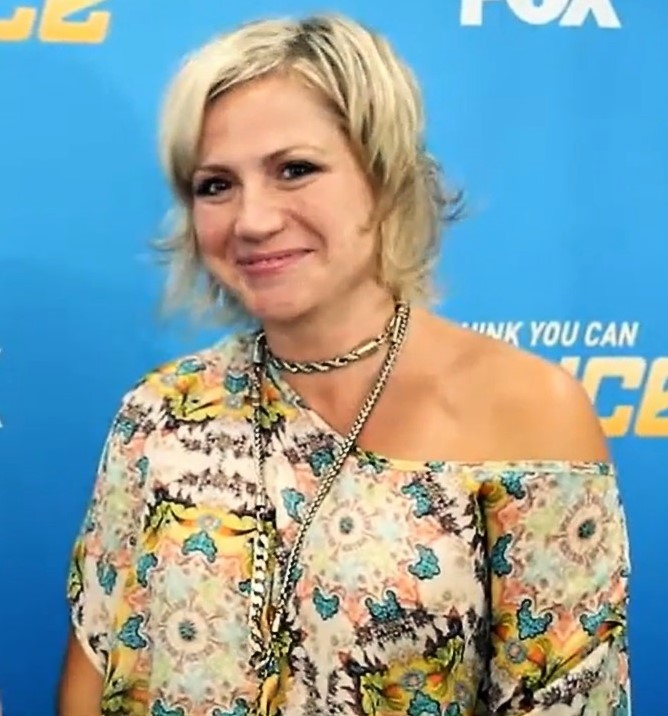
- Tookey in 2013
- Born: July 10, 1976 (age 49); Edmonton, Alberta, Canada
- Occupations: Choreographer, dancer
- Spouse: Gene Gabriel (m. 2005)
- Children: 1
- Parent(s): Shelley and Wayne Tookey
- Website: staceyjtookey.com

Stacey Tookey (born July 10, 1976) is a Canadian choreographer and dancer known for her frequent appearances as a resident choreographer and guest judge on the Canadian and American versions of the dance-competition reality-television show So You Think You Can Dance.

Tookey served as director on the sold-out 2009 So You Think You Can Dance Canada Tour. She also choreographed the music video for the song "Jar of Hearts" by pop singer Christina Perri and appeared on the CBBC show The Next Step.

== Early life and education ==
She was born and raised in Edmonton, Alberta. Her siblings are Kevin Tookey and Kelci Tookey.

Tookey is the eldest child of parents Shelley and Wayne Tookey. She studied ballet and contemporary dance with the Ballet British Columbia Mentor Program, Fusion Dance Company, and as a member of the National Basketball Association's Grizzlies Extreme Dance Team.

== Career ==
Tookey has worked with musical artists including Michael Bublé, Celine Dion, Bette Midler and Justin Timberlake.

She has also performed in concerts as a member of Mia Michaels company R.A.W. and with the Parsons Dance Project in Seoul, South Korea. Other performances include appearing in Carmen with the Houston Grand Opera in Houston, Texas.

She served as assistant choreographer for the Broadway production of A Few Good Men Dancin in New York City, New York.

In 2002, Tookey relocated to Las Vegas, Nevada, where she was an original cast member for the entire five-year run of Celine Dion's show A New Day... at Caesars Palace. Other performances with Dion include appearances on The Oprah Winfrey Show, The 2004 World Music Awards, Larry King Live, CNN's New Year's Eve Countdown Live in Times Square and A&E's biography of Dion.

Tookey received three Primetime Emmy Award for Outstanding Choreography nominations for So You Think You Can Dance in 2010, 2011 and 2012.

In 2012, Dance Spirit reported that Tookey was launching her contemporary dance company, Still Motion, with a debut performance planned in Los Angeles.

Tookey represented Canada at the Genée International Ballet Competitions in London, England.

In addition to performing, Tookey teaches master classes in Mexico, Italy, Argentina and throughout North America, and has been the recipient of many choreography awards.

She is on the faculty of the NUVO dance convention.

== Choreography for So You Think You Can Dance ==
Season	Week	Dancers	Style	Music
Season 1 (Canada)	Week 1	Vincent-Oliver Noiseux; Lisa Auguste	Contemporary	"Slow Me Down"—Emmy Rossum
Season 1 (Canada)	Week 7	Vincent-Oliver Noiseux; Natalli Reznik	Contemporary	"Happy Ending"—Mika
Season 1 (Canada)	Week 9	Nico Archambault; Allie Bertram	Contemporary	"Permanent"—David Cook
Season 5 (US)	Week 2	Karla Garcia; Jonathan Platero	Contemporary	"Falling Slowly"—The Frames
Season 5 (US)	Week 8	Kayla Radomski; Brandon Bryant	Contemporary	"All I Want"—Ahn Trio
Season 2 (Canada)	Week 1	Melanie Mah; Cody Bonnell	Contemporary	"Taking Chances"—Celine Dion
Season 2 (Canada)	Week 3	Corynne Barron; Austin Di Iulio	Contemporary	"Never Say Never"—The Fray
Season 2 (Canada)	Week 4	Kim Gingras; Emanuel Sandhu	Contemporary	"To Build a Home"—The Cinematic Orchestra
Season 2 (Canada)	Week 6	Amy Gardner; Cody Bonnell	Contemporary	"Come Home"—OneRepublic feat. Sara Bareilles
Season 2 (Canada)	Week 6	Group Routine	Contemporary	"Hometown Glory"—Adele
Season 2 (Canada)	Week 8	Tara-Jean Popowich; Vincent Desjardins	Contemporary	"It Doesn't Hurt" (Studio Version)—Katie Thompson
Season 2 (Canada)	Week 9	Jayme Rae Dailey; Vincent Desjardins	Contemporary	"Can't Stop Thinking About You"—Martin Sexton
Season 6 (US)	Week 2	Kathryn McCormick; Jonathan "Legacy" Perez	Contemporary	"2 Steps Away"—Patti LaBelle
Season 6 (US)	Week 3	Channing Cooke; Victor Smalley	Contemporary	"Be Be Your Love" (Live at KRCW)—Rachael Yamagata
Season 7 (US)	Week 2	Melinda Sullivan; Ade Obayomi	Contemporary	"Squander"—Skunk Anansie
Season 7 (US)	Week 3	Billy Bell; Kathryn McCormick	Contemporary	"Jar of Hearts"—Christina Perri
Season 7 (US)	Week 7	Kathryn McCormick; Robert Roldan	Contemporary	"Heaven is a Place on Earth"—Katie Thompson
Season 7 (US)	Week 7	Billy Bell; Ade Obayomi	Contemporary	"Mad World" (Alternate Version) —Michael Andrews featuring Gary Jules
Season 7 (US)	Week 9	Kent Boyd; Allison Holker	Contemporary	"Sundrenched World" (Live Session)—Joshua Radin
Season 3 (Canada)	Week 2	Charlene Hart; Jeff Mortensen	Contemporary	"Breathing"—Alisa Turner
Season 3 (Canada)	Week 3	Julia Harnett; Jesse Weafer	Contemporary	"Falling"—Florence and the Machine
Season 3 (Canada)	Week 5	Amanda Cleghorn; Sebastian Mersch	Contemporary	"Hyperballad"—Whitley
Season 3 (Canada)	Week 6	Danielle Gardner; Jeff Mortensen	Contemporary	"Elephant in the room"—Richard Walters
Season 3 (Canada)	Week 7	Charlene Hart; Mackenzie Green	Contemporary	"One Day Like This"—Elbow
Season 3 (Canada)	Week 8	Amanda Cleghorn; Jeff Mortensen	Contemporary	"Dancing"—Elisa
Season 3 (Canada)	Week 9	Group Routine	Contemporary	"Undone" (With the Hagerman Quartet)—DeVotchKa
Season 8 (US)	Meet the Top 20	Ricky Jamie; Miranda Maleski; Sasha Mallory; Melanie Moore	Contemporary	"In This Shirt"—The Irrepressibles
Season 8 (US)	Week 2	Caitlynn Lawson; Mitchell Kelly	Contemporary	"Turning Tables"—Adele
Season 8 (US)	Week 2	Clarice Ordaz; Jess LeProtto	Contemporary	"Cathedrals"—Jump, Little Children
Season 8 (US)	Week 6	Jess LeProtto; Kathryn McCormick	Contemporary	"The Lonely"—Christina Perri
Season 8 (US)	Week 9	Melanie Moore; Robert Roldan	Contemporary	"Sacrifice"—Sinéad O'Connor
Season 8 (US)	Week 9	Melanie Moore; Sasha Mallory	Contemporary	"Heart Asks Pleasure First"—Ahn Trio
Season 4 (Canada)	Week 1	Jordan Clark; Joey Arrigo	Contemporary	"For the People"—Mark Huculak
Season 4 (Canada)	Week 1	Teya Wild; Kevin Howe	Contemporary	"You Lost Me"—Christina Aguilera
Season 4 (Canada)	Week 5	Geisha Chin; Joey Arrigo	Contemporary	"Gasoline Rainbows"—Amy Kuney
Season 4 (Canada)	Week 8	Lindsay Leuschner; Shane Simpson	Contemporary	"Uninvited"—Alanis Morissette
Season 4 (Canada)	Week 9	Jordan Clark; Christian Millette	Contemporary	"All in Love Is Fair"—Stevie Wonder
Season 9 (US)	Meet the Top 20	Janaya French; Matthew Kazmierczak; Dareian Kujawa; Amelia Lowe	Contemporary	"Modern Drift"—Efterklang
Season 9 (US)	Week 3	Witney Carson; Chehon Wespi-Tschopp	Contemporary	"I Will Always Love You"—Whitney Houston
Season 9 (US)	Week 5	Eliana Girard; Alex Wong	Contemporary	"Bang Bang (My Baby Shot Me Down)"—Nancy Sinatra
Season 9 (US)	Week 8	Chehon Wespi-Tschopp; Allison Holker	Contemporary	"Leave" from Once
Season 10 (US)	Meet the Top 20	Makenzie Dustman; Nico Greetham; Jasmine Harper; Tucker Knox	Contemporary	"Goes On and On"—Sleeping at Last
Season 10 (US)	Week 2	Alexis Juliano; Nico Greetham	Contemporary	"Old Skin"—Ólafur Arnalds & Arnór Dan
Season 10 (US)	Week 2	Mariah Spears; Carlos Garland	Contemporary	"Dead in the Water"—Ellie Goulding
Season 10 (US)	Week 4	Top 14	Contemporary	"New World"—The Irrepressibles
Season 10 (US)	Week 6	Top 6 Girls	Contemporary	"Young and Beautiful" (DH Orchestral Version)—Lana Del Rey
Season 10 (US)	Week 7	Aaron Turner; Kathryn McCormick	Contemporary	"Kissing You"—Des'Ree
Season 10 (US)	Week 10	Amy Yakima; Robert Roldan	Contemporary	"Say Something"—A Great Big World

== Personal life ==
Tookey married actor Gene Gabriel on October 16, 2005, and resides in Los Angeles, California. They have a daughter born in January 2015.

== See also ==
- List of choreographers
- List of dancers
- List of people from Edmonton
- List of people from Las Vegas
- List of people from Los Angeles
