= Kathryn McCormick =

American contemporary dancer and actress

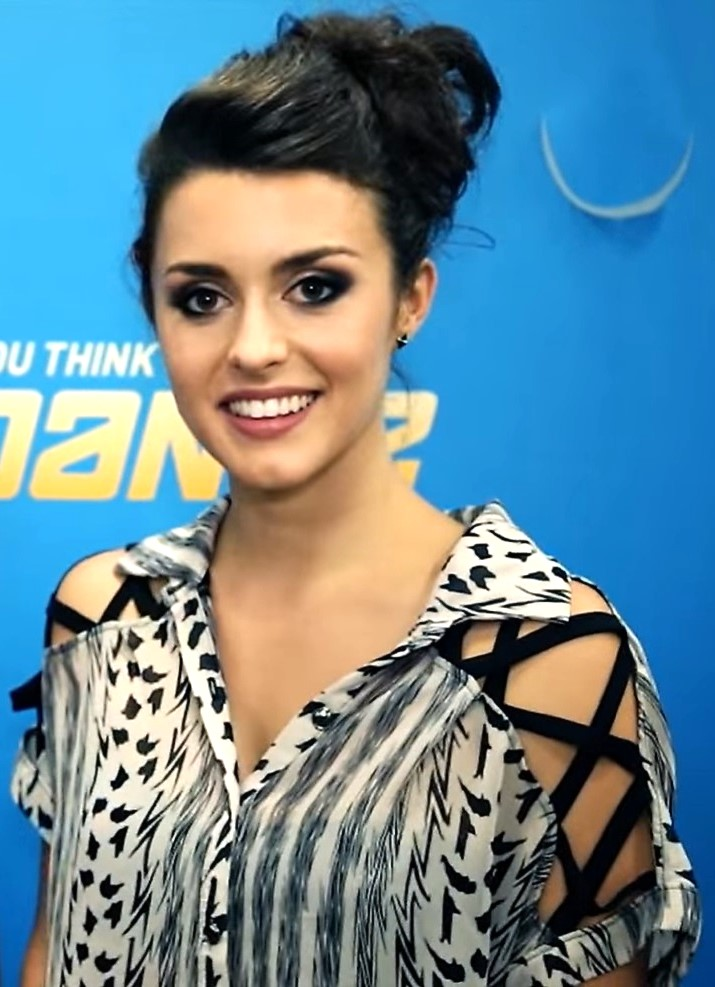
- McCormick in 2013
- Born: 7 July 1990 (age 35); Augusta, Georgia, U.S.
- Years active: 2009–present
- Spouse: Jacob Patrick (m. 2015–2021)

Kathryn McCormick (born 7 July 1990) is an American actress and dancer, noted for placing third in the sixth season of the American televised dance competition So You Think You Can Dance, in which she had the highest placement for a woman on the season. She has returned in seasons 7–13 as one of the show's "all-stars". Additionally, she placed third with fellow So You Think You Can Dance: The Next Generation contestant Tate McRae. She played a leading role in Step Up Revolution (2012), and in the film Dance-Off (2014) opposite Shane Harper.

== Life and career ==
McCormick started dancing at age three at her mother's studio, Dance Connection, then moved to Augusta West Studio, where her mother, Sandra Schmieden, had also studied. She moved to Los Angeles at the age of 18 and landed a non-leading role in the remake of Fame. McCormick has also been featured in the Jar of Hearts music video by Christina Perri. She performed on Dancing with the Stars on November 20, 2012 and April 7, 2014. She is featured as the female dancer in the music video "Dead Inside" by Muse. In 2015, Kathryn and her husband at the time, Jacob Patrick, released their documentary Like Air. Kathryn wanted to bring light to the more optimistic side of competitive dance by showcasing her mentorship with three of her proteges from Dance Makers INC. The documentary focuses on McCormick's mentorship for three girls as they train for DanceMakers Nationals. She continues to tour with the dance convention and competition Dance Makers INC. Additionally, she is a contemporary instructor and faculty member at CLI Studios.

== Filmography ==
Film roles
Year	Title	Role	Notes
2009	Fame	Dancer	
2011	The Burbank Playas Present: Manipede!	Audience Member 1	
2012	Step Up Revolution	Emily Anderson	
2014	Dance-Off	Jasmine	
2015	Lift Me Up	Herself	
2015	Like Air	Herself	

Television roles
Year	Show	Role	Notes
2009	So You Think You Can Dance	Herself	Placed third, 24 episodes
2010–2014, 2016	So You Think You Can Dance	Herself	Appeared as an "all-star", 20 episodes. Placed third in Season 13 with Tate McRae.
2012	Sketchy	Mary	"Jury Duty is War"
2012–2013	Chasing 8s	Stacey Logan	Lead role
2012, 2014	Dancing with the Stars	Herself	Guest, 2 episodes
2015	CSI: Crime Scene Investigation	Nicole	Episode: "The End Game"

Music videos and commercial roles
Year	Title	Artist	Notes
2010	"Jar of Hearts"	Christina Perri	Dance choreographed by Stacey Tookey
2011	"My Favorite Things"	Lea Michele	uncredited appearance, DOVE commercial
2011	"Venus"	Jennifer Lopez	Gillette Venus' Goddess Commercial choreo by Tyce DiOrio
2012	"She Breaks"	Vienne	
2012	"Hands in the Air"	Timbaland featuring Ne-Yo	Music video (for Step Up Revolution)
2013	"Ocean"	John Torres	
2015	"Dead Inside"	Muse	
2019	"In Between"	SCHILLER feat. Jan Blomqvist	
