= The Lonely (Christina Perri song) =

Promotional single by Christina Perri

from the album Lovestrong
- Released: March 29, 2011
- Studio: Sunset Sound (Hollywood, CA); Ocean Way Recording (Hollywood, CA)
- Genre: Pop, soul
- Length: 3:52
- Label: Atlantic
- Songwriters: Christina Perri, David Hodges

"The Lonely" is a song by American singer-songwriter Christina Perri. The song was first released to iTunes on March 29, 2011, the same day that its accompanying lyric video premiered on Teen Vogue. The video was uploaded onto her official YouTube account the following day. The song is included on Perri's debut album, Lovestrong. It was released as the first promotional single of the album.

The song draws inspiration from Perri's life, written about a relationship she had with the emotion of being lonely. Many critics found themselves divided over the song. Most of them positively reviewed the song's chilling tone and powerful lyrics, but many noted that "The Lonely" didn't compare to Perri's lead single, "Jar of Hearts".

== Background and release ==
"The Lonely" was co-written by Christina Perri and David Hodges. One month prior to the release of Lovestrong, Perri revealed that three promotional singles were set to be released via iTunes leading up to the album's release. The first of these was "The Lonely" on March 29, 2011. The two other promotional singles were "Penguin" and "Tragedy". Perri released an official karaoke version of the song onto iTunes on April 5, 2011.

== Music and lyrics ==
Perri wrote "The Lonely" in August 2010 in her driveway at two o'clock in the morning after coming back from a dinner event. She says that when she pulled into her driveway, she realized how alone she was and "cried her eyes out" while writing the song. Perri wrote the song about her relationship with "nobody or with this ghost of somebody". "The Lonely" was intended to be a personification of loneliness - "the saddest, quietest, most painful kind." While revealing the track to Teen Vogue, Perri gave more insight into the song's message, saying "It's lonely personified. It’s my relationship with no one, and I’m very happy I kept it superdramatic and simple at the same time. It’s me, a piano, plus a nineteen-piece orchestra." "The Lonely" places different periods and events in Perri's past on a "very clear timeline".

Perri's voice in the song has been described as somber, complementing its piano melody, which grows louder as the song progresses. The lyrics of the song begin emotionally as Perri sings "2am, where do I begin / Crying off my face again / The silent sound of loneliness / Wants to follow me to bed," only to begin a sad story of losing herself and becoming someone she no longer recognizes: "I’m the ghost of a girl / That I want to be most / I’m the shell of a girl / That I used to know well."

== Critical reception ==
"The Lonely" garnered mixed review by critics, most of whom favored the chilling tone set in the song and compared the song to Perri's lead single "Jar of Hearts". Bill Lamb of About.com included the song in a list of the "Top 10 New Pop Songs", "The Lonely" coming in at number five. Lamb complimented the song, describing it as "another beautiful ballad". Naming the song the "power ballad" of Lovestrong, Jody Rosen of Rolling Stone complimented the song as "bombastic", including it as a "must hear" in the end of her review. While reviewing the album, Tom Lanham of The San Francisco Examiner described the song as a "gorgeous anthem". Chad Grischow of IGN gave the song a negative review, describing it as a sappy string-laced piano ballad that attempted to recreate the "magic" of "Jar of Hearts" but lacked its "emotional heart".

== Music video ==
=== Lyric video ===
To promote the song, Christina Perri released a lyric video, directed by Elliott Sellers. The video debuted on Teen Vogue's website on March 29, 2011, the day of the song's iTunes release. The video was released on Perri's official YouTube account the following day, March 30, 2011.

The video begins with an old-fashioned typewriter typing out the artist's name and the name of the song. As the song starts, the camera moves away from the typewriter to show a brick wall. A light beams upon the song's lyrics on the wall. As the chorus begins, the lyrics are cut into a board as light beams from behind them. As the song continues, the song lyrics are again typed by a typewriter, until pages are shown burning on the floor with larger letters on them continuing the lyrics. The video ends with a closeup of a candle's wax dripping. The candle is later blown out, signifying the end of the video.

== Performances ==
Perri performed the song on her joint tour with James Blunt in Boston, MA at "The House of Blues".

On July 20, 2011, "The Lonely" was performed on So You Think You Can Dance. Perri also performed the song as part of her first tour, the Lovestrong Tour, in 2011–2012.

== Chart performance ==
Chart (2011)	Peak position
US Bubbling Under Hot 100 (Billboard)	2
