= Head or Heart =

Studio album by Christina Perri
- Released: April 1, 2014
- Recorded: 2013
- Studio: Sticky Studios (Los Angeles, California)
- Length: 49:52
- Label: Atlantic
- Producer: Martin Johnson; Jake Gosling; John Hill; Butch Walker; Jack Antonoff

Christina Perri chronology
Lovestrong (2011)	Head or Heart (2014)	Songs for Carmella: Lullabies & Sing-a-Longs (2019)

Singles from Head or Heart
- 1. "Human" Released: November 18, 2013; 2. "Burning Gold" Released: June 9, 2014; 3. "The Words" Released: January 26, 2015

Head or Heart is the second studio album by American singer-songwriter Christina Perri, released on April 1, 2014, via Atlantic Records. It was originally expected to be released on March 11, 2014, but was pushed back to April 1, 2014.

== Background and concept ==
In an interview with Pollstar's Sarah Marie Pittman published on April 25, 2014, Perri described the pressure surrounding the writing of her second album as unavoidable, stating: "I had to completely trick myself, to be quite honest, and pretend that absolutely nobody was going to listen." The first song that she wrote for the album was "Trust", according to Perri, which inspired the rest of the album. After the release of her debut album Lovestrong (2011), Perri toured extensively for 27 months across nine tours. Returning home in October 2012, she quickly began working on new material instead of taking a break, saying that songwriting was the only thing she knew how to do.

Working with Atlantic Records, Perri initially wrote by herself and later participated in 38 writing sessions between January and May 2013. By May, she had recorded a total of 49 songs, which were narrowed down to 16 and finally to 13 for the album. She wrote it by herself for three months and then along with other songwriters for another three months, and recorded a total of 49 songs that she had to choose from for the album by May 2013. Perri says that these 13 songs that she has chosen for the album "were what I think are pure songs, where I wasn't trying." Recording took place mainly in Windlesham, England, with producer Jake Gosling, whom Perri credited with helping define the tone of the record. She also collaborated with Kid Harpoon, Jack Antonoff, John Hill, Butch Walker, and Martin Johnson, the latter producing the lead single "Human." Her session with Harpoon produced the song "Burning Gold," written in just twenty minutes after she nearly declined the meeting due to exhaustion.

On November 11, 2013, Perri announced that her first single from her new album, called "Human", would be released on iTunes on November 18, 2013. On November 28, 2013, Perri revealed that her second album would be titled Head or Heart and is due to be released in March 2014. Perri confessed during an interview with Audacy that she felt burnt out after promoting her last album, Lovestrong. She revealed, "I didn't want to do anything that wasn't genuine, and I was afraid of phoning it in or forcing anything. [...] I remember laying on the floor of my house just crying. Good crying and sad crying at the same time. I was just trying to believe the things that had happened".

In interviews, Perri explained that the album's title reflected her own struggle between rationality and emotion, saying she had an "epiphany" that it should be called Head or Heart. She also noted that her success with "A Thousand Years", featured in the Twilight film series, had brought her global recognition and continued popularity, particularly at weddings and proposals.

== Recording and production ==
Head or Heart was recorded in 2013 with producers Martin Johnson, Jake Gosling, John Hill and Butch Walker. She recorded nine of the album's songs with Gosling near London over an eight-week period before returning to Los Angeles to record the remaining four tracks.

In a December 2013 interview with Audacy, Perri revealed she had worked with Ed Sheeran on a track called "Be My Forever". She stated:

I was the most in love I may have ever been in my whole life, which is awesome because I knew I had a happy song in me. ... As much as I love the heart-wrenching stuff, I didn't want to force a happy song, and I think you can always tell when a song is fake. I remember going in the studio with this guy and him looking at me and I was glowing. And I'm like, "I'm so sorry. I'm in love. This is going to be awful. We're never going to write a song."

== Promotion ==
=== Singles ===
"Human" was released as the first single from the album on November 18, 2013. As of June 2014, the single has sold over a million digital copies in the US. "Burning Gold" was released as the promotional single in March 11, 2014, and later released as the second single from the album in June 9. The accompanying music video premiered on August 1, 2014. Her third single off the album, "The Words" was released on January 26, 2015 along with the music video, starring Colin O'Donoghue and directed by Iouri Philippe Paillé.

=== Tour ===
In support of the album, Perri embarked on a two-month tour across North America. The Head or Heart Tour took place in the spring of 2014, from April 4 through May 26: it began in Denver, Colorado, and ended in Vancouver, British Columbia, Canada.

== Commercial performance ==
Head or Heart debuted at number four on the US Billboard 200, selling 40,000 copies in its first week.

== Critical reception ==
Head or Heart ratings
Review scores
Source	Rating
AllMusic	3.5/5 stars
Newsday	(B−)
The Observer	2/5 stars

Upon its release, Head or Heart was met with generally mixed reviews from music critics. James Christopher Monger of AllMusic awarded the album 3 and a half out of 5 stars, and described the album as "more confident than her debut, yet retaining much of its vulnerability". In a 2 out of 5 stars review for The Guardian, Phil Mongredien stated that the album is "heavy on big, earnest ballads that – with the exception of the soaring 'Sea of Lovers' – are more technically proficient than engaging." Hot Press remarked that with Head or Heart, Perri largely continued the heartfelt, emotional style that defined her debut, observing that listeners who were drawn to "Jar of Hearts" would likely connect with the follow-up album as well.

== Track listing ==
All tracks were produced by Jake Gosling, except where noted.

Head or Heart – Standard edition
No.	Title	Writer(s)	Producer(s)	Length
1.	"Trust"	Christina Perri		3:32
2.	"Burning Gold"	Perri; Kid Harpoon	John Hill; Butch Walker	3:45
3.	"Be My Forever" (featuring Ed Sheeran)	Perri; Jamie Scott		3:20
4.	"Human"	Perri; Martin Johnson	Johnson	4:10
5.	"One Night"	Perri; Kevin Griffin		3:06
6.	"I Don't Wanna Break"	Perri; Jack Antonoff	Antonoff; Hill	3:53
7.	"Sea of Lovers"	Perri; Jim Eliot		3:37
8.	"The Words"	Perri; David Ryan Harris; David Hodges	Walker	4:14
9.	"Lonely Child"	Perri; Griffin		3:45
10.	"Run"	Perri		4:20
11.	"Butterfly"	Perri		3:47
12.	"Shot Me in the Heart"	Perri; Scott		3:43
13.	"I Believe"	Perri; Hodges		4:41
Total length:				49:53

Head or Heart – Google Play bonus track
No.	Title	Writer(s)	Length
14.	"Human" (uncovered version)	Christina Perri	4:19
Total length:			54:12

== Personnel ==
Credits are adapted from AllMusic.

Major credits

- Jack Antonoff — musician, producer, programmer
- Jake Gosling — choir/chorus, engineer, musician, producer, programmer
- John Hill — musician, producer, programmer
- David Hodges — musician
- Martin Johnson — engineer, mixing, musician, producer, programmer
- Christina Perri — choir/chorus, cover direction, musician

Production credits

- Jonathan Allen — engineer
- Mark Bengston — mixing assistant, Pro-Tools
- Chris Bernard — drum technician
- Delbert Bowers — assistant engineer, mixing assistant
- Michael Brauer — mixing
- Tom Coyne — mastering
- Gordon Davidson — assistant
- Chris Gallad — assistant engineer, mixing assistant
- Gersh — drum technician
- John Horne — assistant engineer
- Christian Humphreys — assistant engineer
- Marcus Johnson — assistant engineer

Music credits

- Ruth Barrett — string arrangements
- Charlie Bisharat — strings
- Thomas Bowes — leader
- David Campbell — conductor, string arrangements
- Lori Casteel — music preparation
- Mike Casteel — music preparation
- Adam Coltman — choir/chorus
- Tommy Culm — choir/chorus
- Murray Cummings — musician
- Sophie Davis — choir/chorus
- Hannah Dawson — musician
- Matt Funes — strings
- Matthew Gooderham — choir/chorus
- Eli Gosling — children's chorus
- Lucy Gosling — choir/chorus
- Peter Gosling — choir/chorus, musician
- Zuban Gosling — children's chorus
- Isobel Griffiths — string contractor
- Julian Hallmark — strings
- John Hanson — musician
- Marianne Haynes — musician
- Nicholas Holland — musician
- Jeremy Isaac — musician
- Suzie Katayama — string contractor, strings

Misc credits

- Ryan Chisholm — management
- Tom Gates — management

== Charts ==
Head or Heart chart performance
Chart (2014)	Peak position
Australian Albums (ARIA)	23
Austrian Albums (Ö3 Austria)	41
Belgian Albums (Ultratop Flanders)	80
Belgian Albums (Ultratop Wallonia)	130
Canadian Albums (Billboard)	6
Dutch Albums (Album Top 100)	44
German Albums (Offizielle Top 100)	72
Hungarian Albums (MAHASZ)	27
Irish Albums (IRMA)	14
Scottish Albums (OCC)	9
Swiss Albums (Schweizer Hitparade)	16
UK Albums (OCC)	8
US Billboard 200	4

== Certifications ==
Head or Heart certifications
Region	Certification	Certified units/sales
United States (RIAA)	Gold	500,000^{‡}
^{‡} Sales+streaming figures based on certification alone.

== Release history ==
Head or Heart release history
Region	Date	Format(s)	Label	Ref.
United States	April 1, 2014	CD; digital download	Atlantic	
