= Burning Gold (song) =

Single by Christina Perri

from the album Head or Heart
- Released: June 9, 2014
- Genre: Pop rock
- Length: 3:44
- Label: Atlantic
- Songwriters: Christina Perri; Tom Hull
- Producers: John Hill; Butch Walker

Christina Perri singles chronology
"Human" (2013)	"Burning Gold" (2014)	"The Words" (2015)

Music video
- "Burning Gold" on YouTube

"Burning Gold" is a song by American singer-songwriter Christina Perri for her second studio album, Head or Heart (2014). The song was written by Perri and Kid Harpoon and produced by John Hill and Butch Walker. It was first released through the iTunes Store as a promotional single for Head or Heart on March 11, 2014, and was subsequently released as the second single from the album on June 9. The song was used on seventh episode of second season of the American TV series, The Fosters.

== Content ==
"Burning Gold" is a pop rock song with a moderate tempo and a duration of three minutes and forty-four seconds. It is composed in the key of G major, with a vocal range of E_{3}—E_{5}. As with previous single, "Human", the song's instrumentation consists primarily of piano, but "Burning Gold" also incorporates a ukulele and drums.

== Track listings ==
Digital download

1. "Burning Gold" — 3:44

Burning Gold Remixes — EP

1. "Burning Gold" (Grouplove & Captain Cuts Remix) — 3:47
2. "Burning Gold" (Bit Funk Remix) — 4:52
3. "Burning Gold" (Addal Remix) — 4:52
4. "Burning Gold" (Autograf Remix) — 5:33
5. "Burning Gold" (Stint Remix) — 3:44

== Music video ==
The accompanying music video was directed by Jay Martin and premiered August 1, 2014.

== Chart performance ==
"Burning Gold" debuted at number 39 on the Billboard Adult Pop Airplay chart for the week ending August 9, 2014.

Chart performance
Chart (2014)	Peak position
US Adult Pop Airplay (Billboard)	25
