= The Ocean Way Sessions =

EP by Christina Perri
- Released: November 9, 2010
- Recorded: 2010
- Studio: Ocean Way (Los Angeles, California)
- Length: 17:39
- Label: Atlantic

Christina Perri chronology
The Ocean Way Sessions (2010)	Lovestrong (2011)

Singles from The Ocean Way Sessions
- 1. "Jar of Hearts" Released: July 27, 2010

The Ocean Way Sessions is the debut extended play by American singer-songwriter Christina Perri. It was released on November 9, 2010, via Atlantic Records. It contains live recordings of Perri performing at the Ocean Way Studios in Los Angeles.

== Background ==
The Ocean Way Sessions serves as Perri's first release from Atlantic Records, which signed her in the wake of the unexpected success of her debut single, "Jar of Hearts". All five songs on the EP were performed live at Ocean Way Studios in Los Angeles. All songs were performed with a full band, with the exception of "Jar of Hearts" receiving a solo performance.

== Composition ==
Music has been my everything since day one. It's been my shoulder to cry on, my rock and my best friend.

— Christina Perri, to Seventeen on the album

In an interview with Seventeen, Perri described The Ocean Way Sessions as "raw and bluesy and heartfelt and bold". Perri revealed that inspiration for the album was drawn by everything around her. Love takes a major part in the creation of the album, Perri adding that everything from falling in love, to losing love is the main inspiration. She described that loving love and hating it influenced the choice of the songs for the album and inspired the sound of The Ocean Way Sessions.

The EP showcases Perri's vocal skills and range in emotion, as Perri alternates between breeze midtempo songs to light country sways. In songs such as "Bang Bang Bang", Perri reveals a great sense of humor to her songwriting. Since the entire EP is recorded live, Perri showcases her ability to emotionally strain her voice in performances like "Jar of Hearts", and achy, belted vocals on "Black + Blue".

== Critical reception ==
Professional ratings
Review scores
Source	Rating
AllMusic	3/5 stars
Blast	2.5/5 stars

Andrew Leahey of AllMusic described The Ocean Way Sessions as original, with smoky and pop-based sounds that are reminiscent of a saucier Sara Bareilles or a more metropolitan Brandi Carlile. Leahey added: "With her rebel-chic tattoos and swaggering voice, Perri certainly plays the part of a pop star, and new songs like 'Black + Blue' indicate that 'Jar of Hearts' wasn't necessarily a fluke success." Amy Sciarretto of Artistdirect stated that the EP contains haunting tracks that highlight Perri's vulnerable yet venerable, smoky voice. Joseph Ransom of Blast compared tracks of the songs to the styling of indie-divas such as Fiona Apple and Laura Marling. Ransom reviewed the album's lyrics as "genuine and, at times, rather poignant", later adding that Perri contains the honesty and talent to "survive with any size of audience".

RDEVITT of Rhapsody stated that the angsty adult-alt doesn't stop at lead single "Jar of Hearts", but instead continues throughout the album's other four-tracks showcasing Perri's depth and edge. Chad Grischow of IGN noted that the five-song effort serves as a "warning shot" for Perri and her future with her 2011 debut. Grischow continued to compliment Perri as a "snarky earworm" who succeeds with "great melody, buoyant beat, and catchy-as-they-come hook".

== Track listing ==
The Ocean Way Sessions track listing
No.	Title	Writer(s)	Length
1.	"Bang Bang Bang"	Christina Perri; Barrett Yeretsian; Drew Lawrence	2:57
2.	"Black + Blue"	C. Perri; John Anderson	2:37
3.	"Daydream"	C. Perri; James Walsh; Martin Terefe; Sacha Skarbek	3:47
4.	"Tragedy"	C. Perri; Nick Perri	4:13
5.	"Jar of Hearts"	C. Perri; Yeretsian; Lawrence	4:05
Total length:			17:39

== Charts ==
The Ocean Way Sessions charts performance
Chart (2010)	Peak position
US Billboard 200	144
US Heatseekers Albums (Billboard)	1
