= Distance (Christina Perri song) =

Single by Christina Perri featuring Jason Mraz

from the album Lovestrong
- Released: March 20, 2012
- Recorded: 2011
- Studio: Sunset Sound (Hollywood, CA)
- Genre: Pop
- Length: 3:55
- Label: Atlantic
- Songwriters: Christina Perri; David Hodges

Christina Perri singles chronology
"A Thousand Years" (2011)	"Distance" (2012)	"Human" (2013)

Jason Mraz singles chronology
"I Won't Give Up" (2012)	"Distance" (2012)	"93 Million Miles" (2012)

"Distance" is a song by American singer-songwriter Christina Perri. The new version of the track featuring Jason Mraz is the third official single taken from the deluxe version of her debut studio album Lovestrong (2011) released on March 20, 2012. It was written by Perri and co-written and produced by David Hodges. It is a midtempo ballad about "loving someone at the wrong time in your life" and "being around that one whom your heart longs for without being able to show your true feelings".

The song received generally favorable reviews from music critics, with most praising their "emotional vulnerability and engagement" and their chemistry. The original version of the song is the official theme for the ABC-TV series Revenge whose music video was released April 12, 2012. The official music video featuring Mraz was released on June 30, 2012. It has reached number 20 on the Adult Pop Songs chart.

== Background and composition ==
"Distance" was written by Christina Perri and co-written and produced by David Hodges. It is a midtempo ballad about loving someone at the wrong time in your life. Maybe it's too soon, maybe it's too late, but nevertheless it's about being around that one whom your heart longs for without being able to show your true feelings, without being able to tell them. A new version of the track featuring her good friend Jason Mraz was recorded and released as a single. Perri said: "It's very hard to keep love a secret, and I wrote this song about the one time I had to." With lyrics like, "Please don’t stand so close to me, I’m having trouble breathing, I’m afraid of what you’ll see right now," it reflects reality for anyone who has ever fallen in love.

"Distance" (2012)
A 30 second sample of "Distance", where Perri and Mraz sing about being around that one whom your heart longs for without being about to show your true feelings.

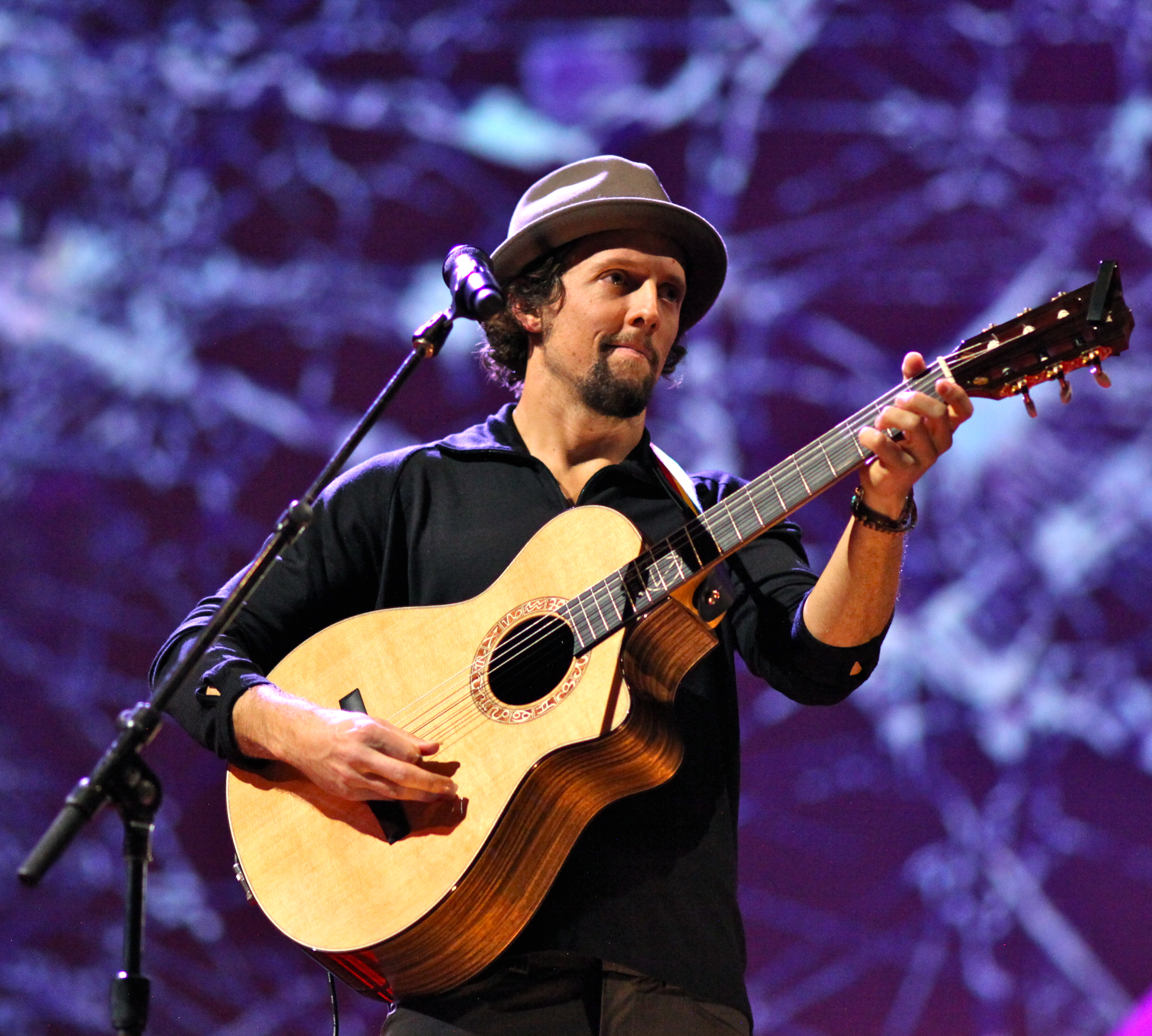
Jason Mraz is featured on the new version, released as a single.

Talking to Artist Direct, Perri further explained the track:

"I wrote it about being in love with someone and not being able to tell them. All of my songs are so specific. They're a story in my life or something I went through which I pull from. I wrote this about the summer of 2010. I fell in love with someone, and we had to work pretty closely together. I had to pretend I didn't like him which was the hardest thing for me because I'm not good at lying [Laughs]. The song is about the feelings and swimming in that kind of tension when you're around someone and trying to keep it cool. That's what it means for me. Instead of telling him I loved him, I wrote it to him in a song. That's where I go."

Perri also talked about the experience of working with Jason Mraz on the new version:

"When a song is born, there's one thing it's about or one feeling it gives for the artist. There's one feeling 'Distance' has given me which is stitched up on my heart, but I think it's always up for interpretation from the listener's perspective. Jason and I performed it together one time because we were doing a radio show and we thought, 'Let's sing a duet!' He said, 'How about 'Distance'?' He liked it on my album so I was like, 'Sure.' We sang it together in San Diego last December. Something happened. Everyone in the audience felt it. My band felt it. Our managers felt it. It was like, "What was that?" There was a three-and-a-half minute journey we went on that was pretty magical. I'm a huge Jason fan so, of course, I felt it. The fact everyone else did probably proved it was something special. We decided to do it again at some other function we were playing together. I was going to put out as a single anyway, and the idea began to get dreamed up. Now, when we perform it, we still go there. With Jason, when we sing this song, we go to this magical place. It feels really good to sing with him. I can't wait to perform it every night together all summer."

== Reception ==
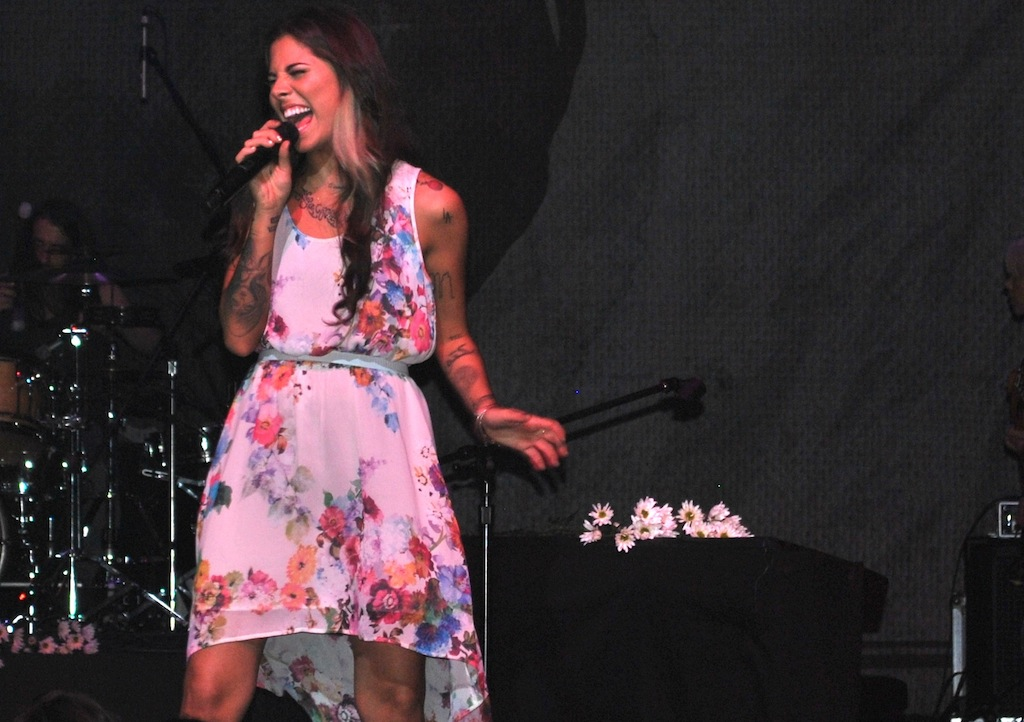
Perri singing "Distance" at the Lovestrong Tour in Puerto Rico.

=== Critical reception ===
The song received generally favorable reviews from music critics. Rolling Stone gave the song a positive review, commending the duet between Perri and Mraz, writing: "The song's bittersweet message and haunting duet vocals from Perri and Mraz carry the clip with plenty of emotional vulnerability and engagement." Becky Bain of Idolator praised the duet, writing: "In addition to having two complementary voices, Perri and Mraz have undeniable chemistry." Kyle Dowling of "Pop Crush" commented: "While melancholy, the song is beautifully done and floods with emotion." Jenna Hally Rubestein of MTV Buzzworthy praised the song, writing: "It's the type of song poignant enough to leave you blubbering and snot-crying into an empty pint of ice cream (since Lady Antebellum's "Need You Now"), because that's just what happens when you add one amazing singer-songwriter to another amazing singer-songwriter. On his music site The Re-View, Nick Bassett called it "quite beautiful on the ears. It sounds like a much more restrained performance from the 'Jar Of Hearts' singer and the emotionally engaging combination of her and Mraz really does connect with some resonance."

=== Chart performance ===
The song debuted at number 40 on the Adult Pop Songs on the Billboard charts. It follows her number seven-peaking Adult Pop Songs hit "A Thousand Years". For the week of September 15, 2012, the song climbed from number 25 to number 20 on the Adult Pop Songs chart.

== Music videos ==
=== Revenge version ===
The original version of the song is the official theme for the ABC-TV series Revenge whose music video was released on April 12, 2012. The video begins with a 20-second clip of Jack Porter revealing his feelings for Emily Thorne played by Nick Wechsler and Emily VanCamp, respectively. In the poignant scene, Jack tells Emily he’s in love with her. Alongside Perri’s slowed vocals and fitting lyrics, a montage of Revenge‘s last season is played. Directed by Elliott Sellers, Perri’s music video was shot on the Revenge set in Los Angeles. With clips from the show, Emily’s love triangle is showcased between her childhood friend Jack and Hamptons’ Daniel Grayson played by Joshua Bowman. It also features shots of Daniel in jail being comforted by a photo of Emily while Emily is at home consoled by Jack. The video also shows Perri interacting with actor Wechsler.

=== Official version ===
The official video featuring Jason Mraz was released on June 30, 2012. Set in a house, the video features Perri dressed in a white dress, soft makeup, and loose waves, while she walks about the house singing before viewers catch a glimpse of Mraz strumming his guitar in presumably, a different location. The two never actually appear on screen together, but the last scene of Perri stripping down pictures and tearing through a wall may leave an impression that she and he will eventually reunite.

"There’s something about the simplicity of the lyrics, with the openness of my heart, I just didn’t want anything dramatic," she told InStyle of her look, a relaxed little white dress and bare feet. "I wanted classy and simple." "I wanted to look exactly the way I look right now in this video, in a dress I would wear at home or on stage, in my jewelry, with the minimal makeup I actually wear, and just being me", she said. "This video is supposed to take you into my reality, not a dream, a real life experience of mine."

== Charts ==
Chart (2012)	Peak position
US Adult Pop Airplay (Billboard)	20

== Certifications ==
Region	Certification	Certified units/sales
United States (RIAA)	Gold	500,000^{‡}
^{‡} Sales+streaming figures based on certification alone.
