= Lovestrong =

2011 studio album by Christina Perri

Studio album by Christina Perri
- Released: June 10, 2011
- Recorded: 2009–2010
- Studios: Sunset Sound (Hollywood, CA)
- Length: 45:21
- Label: Atlantic
- Producers: Joe Chiccarelli; Barrett Yeretsian; David Hodges

Christina Perri chronology
The Ocean Way Sessions (2010)	Lovestrong (2011)	Head or Heart (2014)

Singles from Lovestrong
- 1. "Jar of Hearts" Released: September 26, 2010; 2. "Arms" Released: March 15, 2011; 3. "Distance" Released: March 20, 2012

Lovestrong (stylized as lovestrong.) is the debut studio album by American singer-songwriter Christina Perri. It was released on June 10, 2011, via Atlantic Records. After premiering on So You Think You Can Dance, the lead single "Jar of Hearts" peaked on the Billboard Hot 100 at 17 and was certified double platinum by the RIAA. The second single, "Arms", didn't find as much success on the charts, but was critically acclaimed for its happier tone and music video. Lovestrong also saw multiple promotional singles released onto the iTunes Store: "The Lonely", "Penguin", "Tragedy", and "Bluebird".

The album received mixed reviews, with critics praising Perri's honeyed vocals but criticizing her serviceable approach towards melodies and the album's wearying focus on love and heartbreak. Many critics compared Perri's vocals to those of Ingrid Michaelson, Sara Bareilles, Natalie Merchant, and a "depressive" Colbie Caillat.

== Background and development ==
I believe I picked the best ones—the ones I need to get out into the world. The ones I need to get through. The ones I want to sing to you every night. And the ones i can only hope make you feel something too.
—Christina Perri while revealing the album's track listing.

Perri began writing songs in 2008; and wrote 13 songs throughout the following year; only two of which would make it onto the album, "Mine" and "Black + Blue". After releasing the lead single "Jar of Hearts", Perri found herself signing a major record deal with Atlantic Records for the release of her debut album. Perri recorded the album in 33 days in two studios located on the same property, both running at the same time. She described the process as "the best 33 days of my life and it was the worst 33 days of my life". Describing the hectic conditions she was under while recording, she stated, "I was running from studio one to studio three and I was running back and forth doing the vocals, the piano, the guitar, the harmonies, and the doubles". Perri stated that sometimes they would record two songs in one day, forcing Perri to mentally prepare to sing about one relationship in 2007, then sing another other song with different emotions about a relationship in 2008. Perri stated that she was "ripping [her] stitches" to ensure that a certain song was sung with the right emotions, later adding that it took such an emotional toll on her that she would be driving home later that night crying at two in the morning, forcing herself to pull over and drink a milkshake.

With the album release, Perri created an email address to allow fans to connect to Perri and express their emotions towards certain songs. She stated, "They tell me their stories and why 'Jar of Hearts' made their hearts feel better. It just seriously knocks me off my feet and I just feel so, so lucky". Perri also teamed up with Teen Vogue for the Twitter contest to promote the album. The contest had fans tweet Perri or Teen Vogue with a message on what being "Lovestrong" means and the #lovestrong. hashtag. The grand-prize winner received a Baby Taylor guitar signed by Perri, the Lovestrong limited edition pack and a one-year subscription to Teen Vogue. Two runners-up received a signed Lovestrong poster and a one-year subscription to Teen Vogue.

== Composition ==
"Lovestrong is the one word I use to describe this record + these songs + my heart. It is what I strive to be. It is what I wish for you. In a magical instant boom, me + my little love songs existed. I got swept up into a brand new world. everything was unbelievable. Everything was scary. Everything was more amazing + exciting then i ever dreamed. Everything started to make sense. Every broken piece of me fits together perfectly on this album + makes my heart whole again. Because of these songs. Because of your emails + letters + comments + stories every time i sing these songs a stitch gets stitched… A beat comes back… And a break gets its worth. I hope + wish the same for every heart who hears Lovestrong."

— Christina Perri in her blog about Lovestrong

Since releasing her first single and signing to a record label, Perri spent months with famous studio producer Joe Chiccarelli, who has worked with talents such as The White Stripes, Tori Amos, and The Shins. Together, they worked on the eleven songs that were featured on Lovestrong.

Putting the album together, Perri chose the songs on the album from a list of songs she had written since she was fifteen years old. Perri stated that the feeling of the album was meant to be relatable to every listener. Describing the tracks of the album in detail, Perri stated that although some of the songs are old and some are "new-ish", they represent her the best.

Perri stated that every song on the album is about a relationship. She added she has had a wide range of relationships, feelings, and experiences that were used to write about different aspects of different relationships. The songs chosen for the album share a common theme as one piece of art. She stated, "I'm very happy and proud of the finished product and I couldn't feel better about everything – down to the instruments, to the vibe, to the lyrics, to the performances, to everything about Lovestrong". Perri described the song-writing process in depth with SoundSpike stating:

"For me, there will be days when I write a little poem in a little book, or make a little voice memo in my iPhone. For me, I need to be sitting at an instrument and be overwhelmed. I've tried to look back and see if a song just came out of a sunny day. "Oh, today I'm going to write a song." That's never been the case for me. It's always whether I'm just overwhelmed with some emotion. Whether it be I'm happy, I'm sad, I've fallen in love, I've fallen out of love. I'm lonely, I'm scared. Whatever it be that day. If I'm like a volcano and I'm about to explode, I better run to an instrument because it's about to come out. For me, I don't really go back. I probably should. I have a bajillion pieces of songs. But I seem to just write in one sitting. There's very few occasions where I've gone back and worked on songs later. Normally, I sit down, the song comes out and I'm done."

On her official website's blog, Perri revealed more about the message behind the album title. She stated that since the release of "Jar of Hearts" she has been overwhelmed with the emotion from fans who have related to the song. Perri revealed that fans helped her understand the ups and downs of love, which led her to create Lovestrong. Selecting songs from her "arsenal", Perri picked her favorite songs that she felt fans needed to hear, the songs she needed to give away and the songs she needed to get through. Listening to every intention, story, battle wound, melody and word, Perri revealed that she discovered the main theme of the album: love and strength.

Discussing the influences behind the album and performances, Perri listed "love" as the album's major inspiration. She added that she tried not to listen to any other music other than her current projects to stay inspired and not get distracted. She continued, "Because I write with piano or guitar, I would come in with vocals and one instrument and we'd start from the ground up and add things". Additional influences of the album include Frank Sinatra, Dean Martin, James Taylor, Elton John, and The Beatles. Perri "mushed it all together in my brain and made Lovestrong".

== Release ==
The album was available for preorder on Perri's official website on Tuesday, March 29, 2011. Following the album's official release on May 10, 2011, a deluxe edition was released containing additional bonus songs. The deluxe edition of the album is sold strictly from Perri's website and includes three bonus tracks, a 24-page booklet with exclusive photos, a signed lithograph (limited to 200), a snapshot taken by Christina Perri (limited to 200), Lovestrong racerback tank top, Lovestrong tote bag, an advance stream of the album, and an immediate MP3 download of the album's second single "Arms". A day before the album release, Perri allowed fans who signed up at her official website to stream the entire album. Following the release of the album, Perri released a statement to describe the overwhelming emotions she felt:

"Its kind of amazing how emotional making an album is... And kind of even more amazingly emotional releasing it into the world. everyone is listening + judging + praising or ripping apart my work… words… melodies… sounds...songs… + stories. Some people get it and some dont. It so scary… but its so rewarding too. There is this little 15 year old girl inside of me who is jumping for joy. She's screaming 'We did it christina!!!! We cried those tears for a reason! He broke our heart for a reason! We wrote these songs for today… for may 10th 2011!!! We did it. Its all okay now!!' There is also the 24 year old girl inside of me jumping just as high screaming 'we did it! + it doesn't matter who likes it + who doesn't! We worked so hard for this! We are so lucky to get to wake up and do this everyday!! thank you for making this!! thank you for not giving up on yourself!!!!' I am so happy to give you Lovestrong. We didn't give up. The universe opened a door… we jumped inside… and did it,

=== Singles ===
"Jar of Hearts" premiered on So You Think You Can Dance in June, before Perri even had a record deal. Perri wrote the song in December, only to begin working with her production and management team in February. The song was first added to Perri's YouTube channel on June 30, 2010, and was later released on iTunes on July 27, 2010. The song was featured on the singer's first EP titled The Ocean Way Sessions, and is expected to additionally appear on Lovestrong.

"Arms" was released on March 15, 2011, and served as the album's second single. The video for the song premiered on April 28, 2011, on VH1.

The third single, as stated by Christina Perri on a video on her Facebook, is "Distance" featuring her good friend, Jason Mraz. The music video premiered on June 28, 2012, via Vevo. On his music site The Re-View, Nick Bassett called "Distance" "quite beautiful on the ears. It sounds like a much more restrained performance from the 'Jar Of Hearts' singer and the emotionally engaging combination of her and Mraz really does connect with some resonance."

== Promotion ==
To promote the album, Perri did several performances across the United States. Her first televised performance for the album was on The Ellen DeGeneres Show on May 13, 2011, followed by The Today Show and Jimmy Kimmel Live! on May 18, 2011. "Jar of Hearts" was covered by Lea Michele in the forty-second episode of Glee, Prom Queen, on May 10, 2011. Perri later announced fourteen tour dates with James Blunt in spring 2011 to promote the album. The tour began in Boston in the House of Blues on April 20, 2011, and ended May 8, 2011, in Seattle at the Moore Theatre.

Perri revealed that three promotional singles were set to be released via-iTunes leading up to the album's release. The first promotional single released was "The Lonely" on March 29, 2011, following with the official lyric-video release from Perri's official YouTube account on March 30, 2011. The second promotional single, "Penguin", was released on April 12, 2011, along with its lyric-video on Perri's YouTube account. The third promotional single, "Tragedy", was released on April 26, 2011, to iTunes. On the same day as the album's release, Perri released a free download of "Bluebird" as a fourth promotional single. Fans who had purchased promotional tracks previous to the album's release were eligible to deduct the payment from their official purchase of the album.

== Critical reception ==
Lovestrong ratings
Review scores
Source	Rating
AllMusic	3/5 stars
Entertainment Weekly	(B)
IGN	7/10
Rolling Stone	2/5 stars
USA Today	2/4 stars

Lovestrong garnered mixed to positive reviews by critics. James Christopher Monger of AllMusic gave the album a generally positive review, stating that a good amount of the album is "cut from the same cloth as her signature hit 'Jar of Hearts'". Monger stated that the album barely deviates from the "Jar of Hearts" formula and consists of a "constant barrage of wine glass-gazing, post-relationship, magnetic poetry". While the repetitive formula can grow "thin", Monger added that Perri is gifted with a "pleasant, even-handed voice" and a gift for melodies. Kyle Anderson of Entertainment Weekly gave the album a mixed review, complimenting Perri on her "sweet and full as custard" vocals but stating that her voice can get lost in overplayed angst and too many chilly ballads. Anderson added that songs like "Bang Bang Bang" and "Mine" save the album from "frostbite – and makes its jagged little pills go down easy". She ended the review by saying that the best cuts from the album are "Arms" and "Penguin". A.D. Amorosi of The Philadelphia Inquirer gave the album a very positive review, complimenting Perri's vocals as coolly soulful and reminiscent of Sara Bareilles. Amorosi continued to compliment Perri on her ability to "[draw] the audience into her tales of romantic woe and wonder". Gallucci of Cleveland, Ohio based Cleveland Scene gave the album a mixed review, stating that with the dozens of break-up songs found on the album Perri "barely hide[s] the conflict behind her decisions", later complimenting the album's usage of weighty strings which occasionally drive songs to an emotional on-ramp.

Jody Rosen of Rolling Stone gave the album a mixed review, stating that although Perri has a serviceable way with melodies and has the ability to create an album with eleven songs that are full of plodding tempos and tolling piano chords, she gives off the impression of a "depressive Colbie Caillat". Describing the album as insipid and bombastic, Rosen finished by stating, "As Perri herself might put it: She has "sometalent," but writes "crapsongs." Edna Gundersen of USA Today gave the album a negative review, stating that Perri's "honeyed vocals" are squandered throughout the album, which Gundersen described "as lugubrious, self-absorbed and melodramatic as high school poetry". Gundersen said that although Perri is a promising singer, her debut album Lovestrong stands weak. Chad Grischow of IGN gave the album a mixed review, stating that although Perri is a budding talent, her debut album is unfortunately weighed down by its ballad-heavy track list. Comparing Perri's debut to an American Idol winner's album, Grischow said that her album "is ripe with as much promise as missteps; as she is pigeonholed as a mild-mannered ballad singer, despite evidence that she has more to offer."

== Commercial performance ==
Lovestrong debuted at number four on the US Billboard 200, with first-week sales of 58,000 copies. Lovestrong is Perri's first full-length effort, following her The Ocean Way Sessions EP, which debuted and peaked at number 144 in 2010. Additionally, the album debuted on the US chart for Digital Albums at number three. In Canada, Lovestrong debuted at number nine on the Canadian Albums Chart. On the Australian Albums Chart, Lovestrong peaked at number five. The album debuted at number nine on the UK Albums Chart. In the UK Lovestrong was the thirteenth biggest selling debut album of 2011.

== Track listing ==
All songs were written by Christina Perri, Barrett Yeretsian, and Drew Lawrence, and produced by Joe Chiccarelli and co-produced by David Hodges, except where noted.

Lovestrong – Standard edition
No.	Title	Writer(s)	Producer(s)	Length
1.	"Bluebird"	Christina Perri		3:49
2.	"Arms"	C. Perri; Hodges		4:21
3.	"Bang Bang Bang"			3:05
4.	"Distance"	Chiccarelli; Hodges		3:56
5.	"Jar of Hearts"		Yeretsian; Chiccarelli; Hodges^{[c]}	4:06
6.	"Mine"	C. Perri		3:33
7.	"Interlude"	C. Perri; Hodges		0:50
8.	"Penguin"	C. Perri; John Anderson		4:36
9.	"Miles"	C. Perri; Hodges; Greg Kurstin		4:04
10.	"The Lonely"	C. Perri; Hodges		3:53
11.	"Sad Song"	C. Perri		4:29
12.	"Tragedy"	C. Perri; Nick Perri		4:39

Lovestrong – 2012 Repackaged edition
No.	Title	Composer(s)	Length
13.	"Distance" (featuring Jason Mraz)	Christina Perri; David Hodges	3:54

Lovestrong – Deluxe edition
No.	Title	Writer(s)	Producer(s)	Length
13.	"Distance" (featuring Jason Mraz)	Christina Perri; David Hodges	Joe Chiccarelli; Hodges^{[a]}^{[c]}	3:54
14.	"Backwards"	C. Perri; John Anderson	Hodges	5:20
15.	"Black + Blue"	C. Perri; Anderson	Hodges; Chiccarelli	4:00
16.	"My Eyes"	C. Perri	Hodges; Chiccarelli	4:16
17.	"Jar of Hearts" (music video)	C. Perri; Drew Lawrence; Barrett Yeretsian		4:18
18.	"Arms" (music video)	C. Perri		4:17

=== Notes ===
- ^{^[a]} signifies an additional producer.
- ^{^[c]} signifies an co-producer.

== Personnel ==
Credits were adapted from liner notes.

- John Anderson – composer, flute, guitar (acoustic), guitar (electric), mandocello, piano, slide guitar, vocals (background), Wurlitzer
- Sachico Asano – design
- Michael H. Brauer – mixing
- Greg Gigendad Burke – art direction, design
- David Campbell – orchestration, string arrangements
- Bruce Carver – percussion
- Joe Chiccarelli – producer
- Martin Christopher – viola, violin
- Steve Churchyard – engineer
- Mike Daly – guitar (acoustic), guitar (electric), guitar (tenor), mandocello, mandolin, percussion, vocal arrangement
- Danny T. Levin – trumpet
- Lars Fox – engineer
- Ryan Gilligan – mixing assistant, Pro-Tools
- Lili Haydn – viola, violin
- David Hodges – additional production, composer, percussion, piano, programming, shaker, vocal arrangement, vocals, vocals (background)
- Graham Hope – engineer
- Victor Indrizzo – percussion
- Ted Jensen – mastering
- Oliver Kraus – cello
- Greg Kurstin – composer
- Drew Lawrence – composer, piano
- Lani Lee – photography
- Elmo Lovano – drums, percussion, tambourine
- Geoff Neal – engineer
- Patrick Park – vocals (background)
- Christina Perri – composer, guitar (acoustic), piano, vocals, vocals (background)
- Nick Perri – composer
- Jake Peters – cello
- Zac Rae – accordion, keyboards, organ
- David Schwerkolt – assistant engineer, vocals (background)
- Wesley Seidman – engineer
- Jenni Tarma – bass
- Malcolm Welsford – mixing
- Lyle Workman – guitar (electric)
- Barrett Yeretsian – composer, engineer, producer
- Jason Mraz – vocals, guitar (acoustic)

== Charts ==
=== Weekly charts ===
Chart (2011–2023)	Peak position
Australian Albums (ARIA)	5
Austrian Albums (Ö3 Austria)	7
Canadian Albums (Billboard)	9
Finnish Albums (Suomen virallinen lista)	25
German Albums (Offizielle Top 100)	8
Hungarian Physical Albums (MAHASZ)	33
Irish Albums (IRMA)	5
New Zealand Albums (RMNZ)	27
Polish Albums (ZPAV)	62
Portuguese Albums (AFP)	11
Scottish Albums (Official Charts)	9
South Korean Albums (Gaon)	87
Swiss Albums (Schweizer Hitparade)	6
UK Albums (Official Charts)	9
US Billboard 200	4

=== Year-end charts ===
Chart (2011)	Position
Australian Albums (ARIA)	62
UK Albums (OCC)	78
US Billboard 200	136
Chart (2012)	Position
Swiss Albums (Schweizer Hitparade)	78
UK Albums (OCC)	123

== Certifications ==
Region	Certification	Certified units/sales
Australia (ARIA)	Gold	35,000^{^}
Ireland (IRMA)	Gold	7,500^{^}
New Zealand (RMNZ)	Gold	7,500^{‡}
United Kingdom (BPI)	Gold	100,000^{^}
United States (RIAA)	Platinum	1,000,000^{‡}
^{^} Shipments figures based on certification alone.^{‡} Sales+streaming figures based on certification alone.

== Release history ==
Region	Date	Format	Edition	Label
Canada	May 10, 2011	CD; digital download	Standard; Deluxe	Atlantic
United States	May 10, 2011	CD; digital download	Standard; Deluxe	Atlantic
Australia	July 8, 2011	CD; digital download	Standard; Deluxe	Atlantic
United Kingdom	September 19, 2011	CD; digital download	Standard; Deluxe	Atlantic
Japan	January 24, 2012	CD; digital download	Standard; Deluxe	Atlantic
Germany	January 27, 2012	CD; digital download	Standard; Deluxe	Atlantic
Poland	January 30, 2012	CD; digital download	Standard; Deluxe	Atlantic
