= Arms (song) =

Single by Christina Perri

from the album Lovestrong
- Released: March 15, 2011
- Recorded: 2009–2010
- Studio: Sunset Sound (Hollywood, CA)
- Genre: Folk-pop
- Length: 4:21
- Label: Atlantic
- Songwriter: Christina Perri

Christina Perri singles chronology
"Jar of Hearts" (2010)	"Arms" (2011)	"A Thousand Years" (2011)

"Arms" is a song written and performed by American singer-songwriter Christina Perri, and was the second single released from her 2011 debut album Lovestrong. The song debuted on the Billboard Hot 100 at number 94. The song's accompanying music video debuted on April 28, 2011 on VH1. "Arms" briefly made a comeback in 2017, reaching #36 on the iTunes chart. "Arms" was also the soundtrack to 2016 Hallmark Channel Movie Stop the Wedding, which stars Alan Thicke and Rachel Boston.

== Background ==
"Arms" was written by Perri with musical arrangements from J. Barrera. The song was released onto iTunes March 15, 2011 and was additionally released in a karaoke form, the same day as the single release. On May 15, 2012, a remix by American musician Betatraxx was released.

== Composition ==
"Arms" is Perri's first song to be recorded with a full band, as Perri's one previous single, "Jar of Hearts", contained no drums. Like "Jar of Hearts", "Arms" is built around a piano melody. Although the song "packs a little less venom" than Perri's lead single, it still lyrically contains the "crazy" lovesick emotions typically referred to Perri's style of music. The song begins as a slow love song and transforms into an up-tempo track as kick-drums enter the song midway through. Lyrically, Perri begins the song in a happy tune, singing "I never thought that you would be the one to hold my heart / You came around and you knocked me off the ground from the start." More into the song, Perri begins to question the relationship, ultimately finding comfort as she ends the song repeating the hook. "Arms" progresses from a folky ballad to a melodic love song, incorporating timpani drums.

Perri stated that "'Arms' is about the fight between your heart and your mind. Your heart wants to be loved but your head is always telling you reasons not to be with him or her, or how you are not worth the love. It's about the struggle and finally giving in when you're wrapped in their arms. Then you get it. Then you feel loved and love wins."

== Critical reception ==
"Arms" garnered generally positive reviews by critics, most of which favored the change in pace for Perri. AOL Music compared the song to the music of Ingrid Michaelson and Natalie Merchant. In his review of the album, Kyle Anderson of Entertainment Weekly listed "Arms" as a mandatory download from the album, calling it "chiming". A.D. Amorosi of The Philadelphia Inquirer enjoyed Perri's hushed voice and changing backup spare arrangement on "Arms". Chad Grischow of IGN stated that the song's "dusty gallop of guitar and jangling piano", alongside "Perri's innocent, melodic vocals" made it one of the better love songs off Lovestrong.

== Music video ==
The music video for the single was filmed in what Perri described as "a two-day shoot that kicked my ass so hard." Perri had co-written the video treatment herself. Perri stated that she took a physical pummeling as she played a super-hero during the shoot, jokingly adding, "I don't know why I think I'm an action hero." For the flying scenes, she was involved in weeks of training. The song music video premiered on VH1 on April 28, 2011. The video then appeared all weekend on VH1's "Top 20 Countdown", April 30, May 1 and May 3. The video was added to Perri's official YouTube account the day following its official release.

=== Synopsis and reception ===
The video begins with Perri lying down in a bed with her boyfriend (played by actor and model John Andersson) as she sings the song looking directly into the camera. As the camera zooms out, it shows that the bed is located in a mountain meadow. As Perri closes her eyes to sleep, the video then begins to take on a dream-sequence theme. In her dream, Perri is being carried away in her bed sheets over a body of water where she is dropped. Scenes of Perri bothered as she sleeps are interlaced into the video as it continues. As Perri continues to dream, she emerges from the water into a stormy night and is pulled onto a boat by two unknown men who begin to play instruments to the song's beat. As Perri performs on the boat, a cluster of black balloons wrap a black ribbon around Perri's arm, and carry her away into the sky over London and then over an open field. As Perri approaches the open field, she frees herself from the balloons' ribbon and falls safely onto a BMW Mini. Perri then drives the Mini back to the location of her bed and runs into the arms of her boyfriend.

VH1 stated that conceptually, the video is a "winner", adding that the most enjoyable parts of the video are the vocal close-ups. VH1 dismissed the rain sequence of the video as Perri is rescued onto the boat, saying it "doesn't seem particularly necessary" but complimented the addition of the band.

As of June 2021, the video has been viewed 74.6 million times on Perri's YouTube account.

==== Lyric video ====
Perri revealed a lyric music video for the single as well, released on March 15, 2011. The video was directed by Elliot Sellers, who additionally made lyric videos for others songs released by Perri. The video took over 3,000 photos to make. The entire video is shot behind an old fashioned projector, where the song's lyrics are projected upon a blank tent-side.

== Charts ==
=== Weekly charts ===
Chart (2011)	Peak position
Israel International Airplay (Media Forest)	9
US Billboard Hot 100	94
US Adult Contemporary (Billboard)	29
US Adult Pop Airplay (Billboard)	13

=== Year-end charts ===
Chart (2011)	Position
US Adult Pop Airplay (Billboard)	46

== Certifications ==
Region	Certification	Certified units/sales
United States (RIAA)	Platinum	1,000,000^{‡}
^{‡} Sales+streaming figures based on certification alone.
