= A Thousand Years =

2011 single by Christina Perri

Single by Christina Perri

from the album The Twilight Saga: Breaking Dawn — Part 1: Original Motion Picture Soundtrack
- Released: October 18, 2011
- Recorded: 2011
- Genre: Pop
- Length: 4:45 (Part 1); 5:05 (Part 2)
- Label: Atlantic
- Songwriters: Christina Perri; David Hodges
- Producer: David Hodges

Christina Perri singles chronology
"Arms" (2011)	"A Thousand Years" (2011)	"Distance" (2012)

Music video
- "A Thousand Years" on YouTube

"A Thousand Years" is a ballad recorded by American singer and songwriter Christina Perri, written by Perri and her producer David Hodges, for The Twilight Saga: Breaking Dawn – Part 1. The song was released worldwide as a digital download on October 18, 2011 and serves as the second single by Atlantic Records from the film's official soundtrack.

The song became a sleeper hit, eventually reaching its peak position of number 7 in Ireland, number 11 for the UK singles chart, and number 31 on the US Billboard Hot 100, following the release of the sequel The Twilight Saga: Breaking Dawn – Part 2 (2012); Perri re-recorded the song, again produced by Hodges, for the sequel, this time with vocals from Steve Kazee. It is certified thirteen-times Platinum in the US, seven-times Platinum in Australia, and five-times Platinum in the United Kingdom and New Zealand. It has 2.4 billion streams on Spotify.

== Composition ==
"A Thousand Years" is in the key of B-flat major, in 6/8 time with a vocal range of F_{3} to C_{5}. It was written by Perri herself and her producer David Hodges inspired by the love affair between Edward and Bella in the novel and subsequent film series Twilight. In an interview with Teen Vogue, Perry explain about the song: "The producers came to me in 2011 and said, can you write a song for Breaking Dawn – Part 1? So I went and saw the film six months before it came out, and wrote 'A Thousand Years' for Edward and Bella. I'm not a vampire, even though I wish I was, but I tried to step into their love story."

== Music video ==
An official lyric video of the song was premiered on October 17, 2011, via Perri's official Facebook and Twitter pages as well as her official website. On October 26, 2011, she released an official video for the song on her YouTube channel. The video begins with Perri holding a candle. It features a few clips from The Twilight Saga: Breaking Dawn – Part 1 interspersed between scenes with Perri singing in a room with a floor full of candles. Perri ends the video singing into a sunset.

As of June 2026, the video has accumulated 2.8 billion views.

== Chart performance ==
"A Thousand Years" became a sleeper hit globally, accumulating its sales over several years.

On the week of October 23, 2011, the song debuted at number 63 on the US Billboard Hot 100 chart, and number 70 on Canadian Hot 100. It eventually peaked at number 31 on the Billboard Hot 100, giving Perri her second top 40 hit. By July 2013, the song has sold over three million digital downloads in the US. As of June 2014, the song had sold 3,657,000 copies in the US. On June 30, 2026, the single was certified diamond by the Recording Industry Association of America (RIAA) for selling thirteen million units in the United States.

In the United Kingdom, the song reached number 32 on its original release in 2011. The following year, after the release of The Twilight Saga: Breaking Dawn – Part 2, it peaked at number 13. In 2013, it reached a new peak of 11. It has since been certified five-times platinum by the British Phonographic Industry (BPI), denoting sales equivalent to 3 million units.

As of April 2026, the song had accumulated over 27.1 million video creations on TikTok, ranking 17th among the most-used songs on the platform worldwide.

== Cover versions ==
Scottish-American actor & singer John Barrowman covered the song on his 2014 studio album You Raise Me Up.

In March 2018, mothers of children with Down syndrome in the United Kingdom produced a video cover of the song for World Down Syndrome Day that went viral. Christina Perri declared her support for the idea and waived any copyright claim to the music in support of the campaign. As of September 2026, the video has over 12 million views.

In 2026, the song was featured prominently in Shrinking's third season, with Perri also performing it with the cast for a behind the scenes video.

== Charts ==
=== Weekly charts ===
==== "A Thousand Years" ====
Chart (2011–2025)	Peak position
Australia (ARIA)	13
Austria (Ö3 Austria Top 40)	19
Belgium (Ultratip Bubbling Under Flanders)	44
Brazil (Billboard Brasil Hot 100)	58
Canada Hot 100 (Billboard)	70
Czech Republic Airplay (ČNS IFPI)	13
Denmark (Tracklisten)	27
Finland (Suomen virallinen lista)	19
Hungary (Single Top 40)	18
Ireland (IRMA)	7
Italy (FIMI)	30
New Zealand (Recorded Music NZ)	11
Scottish Singles Sales (Official Charts)	9
Slovakia Airplay (ČNS IFPI)	96
Spain (Promusicae)	26
Switzerland (Schweizer Hitparade)	21
UK Singles (Official Charts)	11
US Billboard Hot 100	31
US Adult Contemporary (Billboard)	11
US Adult Pop Airplay (Billboard)	7
US Latin Pop Airplay (Billboard)	24
US Pop Airplay (Billboard)	22

==== "A Thousand Years, Pt. 2" ====
Chart (2012–13)	Peak position
Australia (ARIA)	39
Brazil (Billboard Brasil Hot 100 Airplay)	98
Canada Hot 100 (Billboard)	40
France (SNEP)	66
Germany (GfK)	26
Italy (FIMI)	27
Netherlands (Single Top 100)	80
New Zealand (Recorded Music NZ)	31
US Billboard Hot 100	53

=== Year-end charts ===
Chart (2012)	Position
Australia (ARIA)	67
New Zealand (Recorded Music NZ)	50
UK Singles (OCC)	110
US Billboard Hot 100	87
US Adult Contemporary (Billboard)	21
US Adult Pop Airplay (Billboard)	24

Chart (2013)	Position
Brazil (Crowley)	71
UK Singles (OCC)	57

=== Decade-end charts ===
Chart (2010–2019)	Position
Australia (ARIA)	46
UK Singles (OCC)	79

== Certifications ==
=== "A Thousand Years" ===
Region	Certification	Certified units/sales
Australia (ARIA)	7× Platinum	490,000^{‡}
Canada (Music Canada)	Platinum	80,000^{*}
Denmark (IFPI Danmark)	2× Platinum	180,000^{‡}
Germany (BVMI)	3× Gold	450,000^{‡}
Italy (FIMI)	2× Platinum	100,000^{‡}
Mexico (AMPROFON)	Platinum	60,000^{*}
New Zealand (RMNZ)	6× Platinum	180,000^{‡}
Spain (Promusicae)	2× Platinum	120,000^{‡}
Switzerland (IFPI Switzerland)	Gold	15,000^{^}
United Kingdom (BPI)	5× Platinum	3,000,000^{‡}
United States (RIAA)	13× Platinum	13,000,000^{‡}
Streaming
Denmark (IFPI Danmark)	Gold	900,000^{†}
^{*} Sales figures based on certification alone.^{^} Shipments figures based on certification alone.^{‡} Sales+streaming figures based on certification alone.^{†} Streaming-only figures based on certification alone.

=== "A Thousand Years, Pt. 2" ===
Region	Certification	Certified units/sales
United States (RIAA)	Gold	500,000^{‡}
^{‡} Sales+streaming figures based on certification alone.

== Release history ==
Country	Date	Format	Label
United States	October 18, 2011	Digital download	Atlantic
Canada	October 18, 2011	Digital download	WEA International Inc.
Australia	October 18, 2011	Digital download	WEA International Inc.
United Kingdom	November 7, 2011	Digital download (album only)	Atlantic
