= Christina Perri =

American singer-songwriter (born 1986)

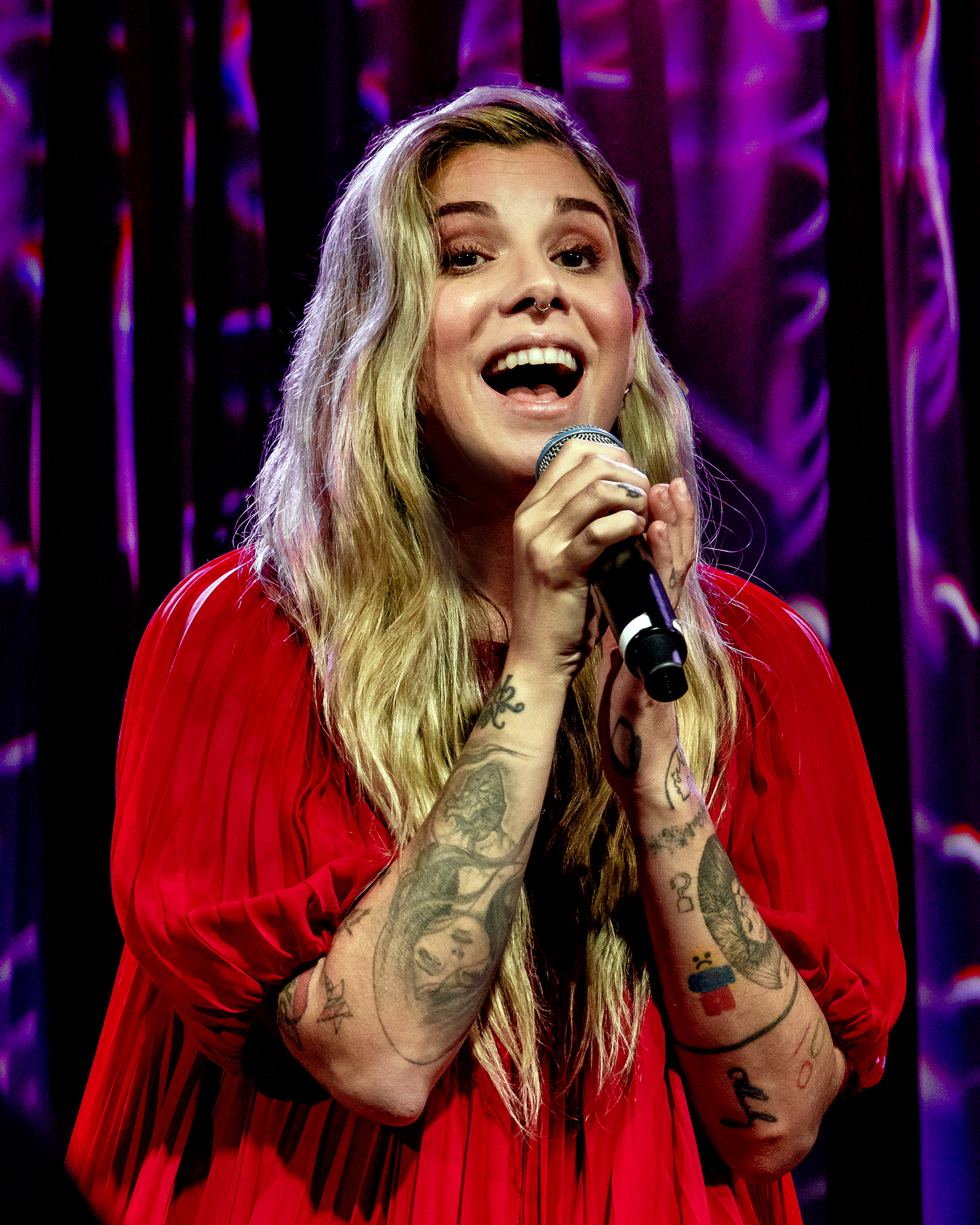
- Perri in 2022
- Born: Christina Judith Perri; August 19, 1986 (age 40); Bensalem, Pennsylvania, U.S.
- Occupations: Singer; songwriter
- Spouse: Paul Costabile (m. 2017; div. 2025)
- Children: 2
- Relatives: Nick Perri (brother)
- Musical career
- Genres: Pop; pop rock; children's music; alternative rock
- Instruments: Vocals; guitar; piano; keyboards
- Labels: Atlantic; Elektra
- Website: christinaperri.com

Signature
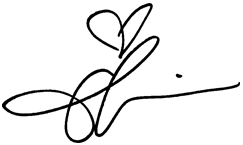

Christina Judith Perri (born August 19, 1986) is an American singer and songwriter. After her debut single "Jar of Hearts" was featured on the television series So You Think You Can Dance in 2010, Perri signed with Atlantic Records and released her debut extended play, The Ocean Way Sessions. Her debut studio album, Lovestrong (2011), followed soon after and has since been certified platinum by the Recording Industry Association of America (RIAA).

Perri also gained recognition for writing and recording "A Thousand Years", the love theme for the film The Twilight Saga: Breaking Dawn – Part 2 (2012), which appears on the accompanying soundtrack. The song went on to sell over 10 million copies in the United States, being certified Diamond, and the official music video reached two billion views on YouTube in December 2021. She later released her second extended play, A Very Merry Perri Christmas (2012), followed by her second studio album, Head or Heart (2014). After recording the lullaby albums Songs for Carmella (2019) and Songs for Rosie (2021), Perri released her third pop and fifth overall studio album, A Lighter Shade of Blue (2022). In 2023, she released the albums Songs for Pixie and Songs for Christmas.

== Early life ==
Perri was born on August 19, 1986, in Bensalem, Pennsylvania, a suburb of Philadelphia. She is of Italian and Polish descent, and has called her family "very Italian". She has an older brother, Nick Perri, who formerly played guitar with Shinedown, Silvertide, Perry Farrell and Matt Sorum and cousin Dominic Perri.

She graduated from Saint Ephrem Catholic School, and then from Archbishop Ryan High School in 2004 and later attended the University of the Arts. She taught herself how to play guitar as a 16-year-old by watching a videotape of Shannon Hoon from the group Blind Melon performing on VH1. In college, she majored in communication for a year before dropping out to pursue a music career. She frequently sang and acted in musical theater as a child. Perri claims to have learned to play the piano and guitar because she missed hearing music in the house when she moved away. According to Perri, whenever she played the guitar or piano, she would sing and "all of a sudden these songs would appear."

== Career ==
=== Early career ===
Perri moved to Los Angeles on her 21st birthday. According to Perri, she felt terrified to be over 3,000 miles away from her family, saying she "cried [her] eyes out every day."

Later that year, she married and began to produce music videos for a living. She divorced 18 months later and moved into a small apartment on her own to focus entirely on working on music. She moved back to Philadelphia by the end of 2009; it was during this time that she wrote "Jar of Hearts". She later moved back to Los Angeles, working as a waitress at the Melrose Cafe during the day and recording at night.

=== 2010–2012:Lovestrong ===
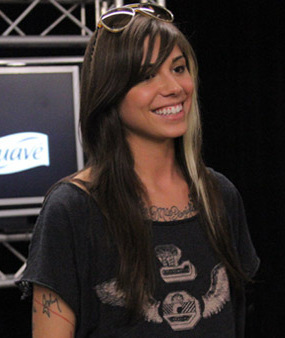
Perri in a 2011 interview

Perri's song "Jar of Hearts" was featured on So You Think You Can Dance during the show of June 30, 2010 in a performance by Billy Bell and Kathryn McCormick. Perri's friend Keltie Knight passed the song to show choreographer Stacey Tookey, as Perri was unsigned at the time. Perri and Knight watched the performance in the audience. Following its exposure on the show, "Jar of Hearts" sold 48,000 digital copies in its first week, debuting on the Billboard Hot 100 at No. 63 and reaching No. 28 on Billboard's Hot Digital Songs. Within a month, it had sold more than 100,000 copies. The song peaked at number 17 on the Hot 100.

Following the success of "Jar of Hearts", Perri signed a deal with Atlantic Records on July 21, 2010. She recorded an EP titled The Ocean Way Sessions that was released on November 9, 2010. The second single from Perri's debut album, "Arms", was released on March 15, 2011. She released her debut album, Lovestrong, on May 10, 2011. It debuted at number 4 on the Billboard 200, with first-week sales of 58,000 copies. In the United Kingdom, Lovestrong was the thirteenth highest selling debut album of 2011.

In July 2011, Perri embarked on her first world tour, the Lovestrong Tour, which lasted for almost exactly a year and consisted of 71 dates. Perri released her single "A Thousand Years", which appeared on the soundtrack of The Twilight Saga: Breaking Dawn – Part 1, on October 18, 2011. The song debuted at number 63 on the Billboard Hot 100 and peaked at number 31, and has since been certified 4× platinum with over 4 million sales in the US alone. The song is Perri's most successful single to date. The album's third and final single, "Distance", was released on March 20, 2012. Perri also announced in San Juan, Puerto Rico during her Lovestrong Tour that she had begun to work on her second studio album. In addition, in late 2012 Perri was the opening act for Jason Mraz's concert tour, the Love Is a Four Letter Word Tour, across continental North America in 2012.

On August 1, 2012, she announced via Facebook that A Very Merry Perri Christmas EP would be released on October 16, 2012. The album consisted of one original song, "Something About December", which served as the lead single, as well as four covers. Perri re-recorded "A Thousand Years" for The Twilight Saga: Breaking Dawn – Part 2 soundtrack with guest vocals from Steve Kazee, titled "A Thousand Years, Pt. 2". On May 14, 2013, she received the BMI award for her song "A Thousand Years" at the 61st annual BMI Pop Awards held in Beverly Hills, California.

=== 2013–2019: Head or Heart, Songs for Carmella ===
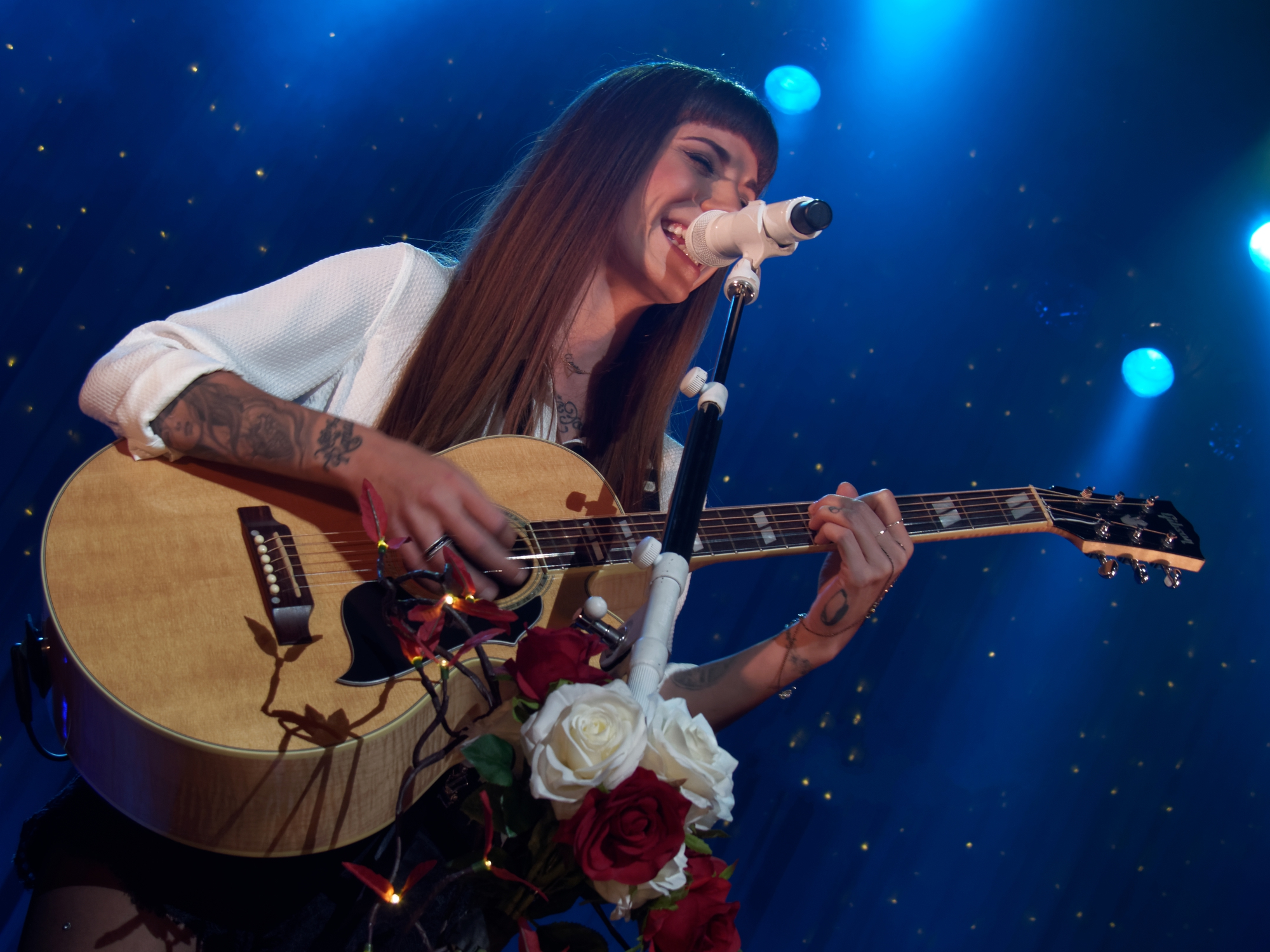
Perri on her Head or Heart Tour in Los Angeles, California, in 2014

In 2013, Perri began regularly tweeting and posting pictures on Instagram regarding her second studio album's progress using the hashtag "#albumtwo". In February, Perri partnered with the non-profit organization To Write Love on Her Arms on a three-stop tour to raise money for the charity and debuted a brand new song from her second studio album, titled "I Believe", at the shows. On June 21, Perri tweeted announcing that the second album was coming together.

On November 11, 2013, Perri announced that her first single from her new album is called "Human". The song was released on November 18, 2013, on iTunes. Perri performed the song on The Queen Latifah Show the same day. On November 28, 2013, Perri revealed that her second studio album would be titled Head or Heart and it was released on April 1, 2014. On May 29, it was announced that she would open Demi Lovato's new North American World Tour dates. Perri later announced that her second concert tour would be titled the Head or Heart Tour, which began in April 2014. On June 9, she released the second single from her second album, "Burning Gold". The video was released on August 1. On December 19, 2014, Perri performed in the annual "Christmas in Washington" holiday concert.

In June 2016, it was announced that Perri would feature on the title track of Lindsey Stirling's third studio album, Brave Enough, which came out on August 19, 2016. Later, on December 14, 2018, she revealed her first lullaby album, Songs for Carmella: Lullabies & Sing-a-Longs, dedicated to her daughter and released on Carmella's first birthday, January 17, 2019. On November 22, 2019, Perri also launched a deluxe version of her 2012 Christmas EP, titled A Very Merry Perri Christmas (Extra Presents), featuring additional covers of "I'll Be Home for Christmas" and "Let It Snow".

=== 2021–present: Songs for Rosie, A Lighter Shade of Blue, and Songs for Pixie ===
Perri released her second lullaby album, titled Songs for Rosie. It serves as a tribute to her late daughter, Rosie, and acts as a companion to Songs for Carmella. It was released on November 24, 2021, coinciding with what would have been Rosie's first birthday.

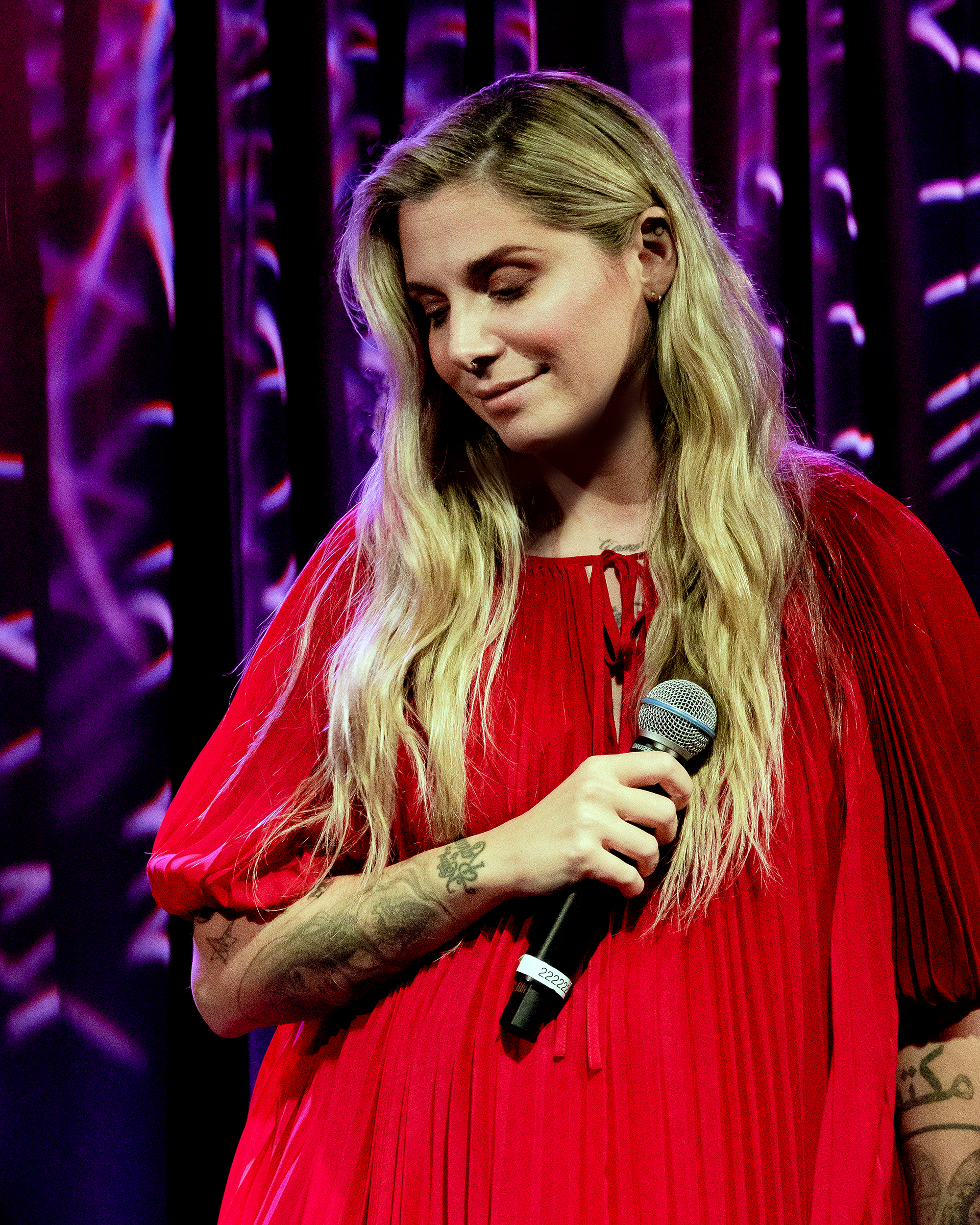
Perri performing at the Grammy Museum in 2022

In March 2022, Perri released a song "Evergone" as the lead single from her forthcoming fifth overall studio album. Speaking to Philip Logan of CelebMix about the single, Perri discussed waiting a year between writing the song and its actual release, stating, "I needed to put an oxygen mask on myself first before I could then venture back out into the world to try to help others breathe a little easier too".

Describing the timeline of the album's conception, Perri reveals that writing sessions actually began in 2017 but mentions that she felt there was "something missing". In the interview, Perri discusses her experience working with British singer-songwriter Luke Sital-Singh, crediting him with the album's artistic direction. She states, "We ended up writing this song called 'Blue', and as soon as it was finished, my artistic instinct kicked in, and I saw the whole vision for how I wanted the record to be".

The fifth overall studio album, A Lighter Shade of Blue, was released by Elektra Records on July 15, 2022. In August 2024, Perri announced that she was in the process of writing a children's book based on her 2011 song, "A Thousand Years". Speaking to People about the book, Perri said, "I decided to make lullaby albums because that's what I'm singing to my girls, and so I make a lullaby version of 'A Thousand Years', and now everybody's playing that on TikTok." She added, "People played the original to their kids long before I decided to sing it to my own kids... It just happened so naturally..." Ultimately, she concluded, "...It kind of felt like the most natural thing to do to make it a kid's book."

In 2026, she will hold a one night only show in Los Angeles, California on December 3 to celebrate the fifteenth anniversary of her song "A Thousand Years", titled An Evening With Christina Perri.

== Personal life ==
Perri and Paul Costabile became engaged in June 2017 and were married on December 12, 2017. In August 2017, Perri announced she was pregnant with their first child. Perri gave birth to their daughter, Carmella Stanley, in January 2018. In January 2020, Perri said she was "completely heartbroken" after suffering a miscarriage at 11 weeks. In July, Perri announced she was pregnant for a third time. On November 10, 2020, Perri said she was experiencing pregnancy complications.

Two weeks later, she said that her daughter was stillborn, stating: "She is at peace now and will live forever in our hearts." In May 2022, Perri announced she was pregnant for a fourth time. Perri gave birth to their daughter, Pixie Rose, in October 2022. In November 2025, Perri and Costabile filed for divorce. Perri said in 2022 that she has a blood-clotting disorder that may have contributed to her two pregnancy losses. She receives daily injections of a blood thinner. She has more than 50 tattoos.

== Bibliography ==
- A Thousand Years (2025)

== Discography ==
- Lovestrong (2011)
- Head or Heart (2014)
- Songs for Carmella: Lullabies & Sing-a-Longs (2019)
- Songs for Rosie (2021)
- A Lighter Shade of Blue (2022)
- Songs for Pixie (2023)
- Songs for Christmas (2023)

== Awards and nominations ==
Year	Awards	Work	Category	Result
2011	MP3 Music Awards	"Jar of Hearts"	The BNC Award	Won
2011	4Music Video Honours	"Jar of Hearts"	Best Video	Nominated
2012	RTHK International Pop Poll Awards	Herself	Top New Act	Silver
2013	BMI Pop Awards	"A Thousand Years"	Award-Winning Song	Won
2013	Musicnotes Song of the Year Awards	"A Thousand Years"	Song of the Year	Won
2013	Musicnotes Song of the Year Awards	Herself	Publisher of the Year	Won

== Concert tours ==
Headlining

- Lovestrong Tour (2011–2012)
- Head or Heart Tour (2014)

Co-Headlining

- Girls Night Out, Boys Can Come Too Tour (with Colbie Caillat and Rachel Platten) (2015)

Opening act

- Love Is a Four Letter Word Tour (2012)
- Demi World Tour (2014)
- Native Tour (2014)
- x Tour (2015)
- Billy Joel @ Citizen Bank Park (2016)
- Ed Sheeran Tour (2016)
