= Jar of Hearts =

2010 debut single by Christina Perri

Single by Christina Perri

from the EP The Ocean Way Sessions and the album Lovestrong
- Released: September 27, 2010
- Studio: Chemistry in Space Studios (Los Angeles, CA)
- Genre: Pop
- Length: 4:07
- Label: Atlantic
- Songwriters: Christina Perri; Drew Lawrence; Barrett Yeretsian
- Producer: Barrett Yeretsian

Christina Perri singles chronology
"Jar of Hearts" (2010)	"Arms" (2011)

Music video
- "Jar of Hearts" on YouTube

"Jar of Hearts" is the debut single by American singer Christina Perri. The song was released onto iTunes on September 27, 2010, a week after its debut on So You Think You Can Dance. The song was included on Perri's debut EP, The Ocean Way Sessions (2010), and appeared on Perri's debut studio album, Lovestrong (2011). The song was co-written by Perri, Drew Lawrence, and Barrett Yeretsian. Perri drew inspiration for the song from a real-life experience with a love interest who wanted to rekindle a broken relationship. After its debut, the song was released onto iTunes where it later rose to the top 20 spot in one week.

Perri was unsigned at the time of the song release, leading to discussion between critics who favored the song. The song charted on multiple charts in both the United States and Canada at numbers 17 and 21 respectively. The song sold a total of 47,500 downloads in its opening week. In 2011, it was released in the UK and peaked at number four on the UK Singles Chart, spending 31 weeks in the top 40 and 48 weeks in the top 75. It was later certified triple platinum after selling and streaming 1,800,000 units. It was the 11th best-selling single of 2011 in the UK. It also reached the top 10 in Australia, Austria, Finland, Germany, Ireland, and Switzerland.

== Background and release ==
The song is so vulnerable, but she was stomping on the piano in our lobby with her combat boots. She was so confident and poised — you could visualize her at Madison Square Garden
—Julie Greenwald, chairman and COO of Atlantic Records

After teaching herself to play six chords on the guitar, Perri wrote "The Perfect Man" about the same person "Jar of Hearts" describes. "Jar of Hearts" premiered on So You Think You Can Dance in June, before Perri even had a record deal. Perri's best friend, Keltie Colleen (a Rockette), passed it on to one of the show's choreographers, Stacey Tookey, who later choreographed a contemporary dance routine for All-Star Kathryn McCormick and contestant Billy Bell.

Perri wrote the song in December 2009, only to begin working with her production and management team in February 2010. While recording for an EP, "Jar of Hearts" was additionally going to be recorded with a full band; however, Perri later decided against it stating that "I imagined people dancing to it. It was all a big 'just in case.'"

The song was first added to Perri's YouTube channel on June 30, 2010, and was later released on iTunes on September 27, 2010. A karaoke-version of the song was also officially released onto iTunes February 1, 2011. The song was featured on the singer's first EP titled The Ocean Way Sessions, and has additionally appeared on Perri's debut album, Lovestrong.

== Theme and composition ==
"Jar of Hearts" has been described as an autobiographical song for Perri, recalling an ex-boyfriend who wanted to reconnect after a tough breakup. Christina Perri, Drew Lawrence and Barrett Yeretsian wrote the lyrics; Barrett Yeretsian and Christina Perri produced it. "Jar of Hearts" is a pop ballad that is about shunning the continued advances of a former flame who was ungrateful while together, yet now wants to rekindle a failed romance.

"Jar of Hearts" (2010)
A 24-second sample of "Jar of Hearts", which features a piano and Perri's voice.

Lyrically the ballad revolves around an ex-boyfriend of Perri's, who sings personal lyrics. In a blog by the artist, Perri described that the song came from true experiences, stating "I wrote the song after I went home to Philadelphia for the holiday last December. I sat in my childhood bedroom and hid from the boy (with the jar of hearts) who wanted to see me. My heart wanted to see him, my head knew better. I couldn't take one more break so I wrote the song instead."

"Jar of Hearts" is a moderate piano-ballad song pacing in common time, written in the key of C minor (with the chorus in its relative key, E♭ major). Perri's vocals range from the notes E♭_{3} to C_{5} as she sings to the score of pianos and chords. The song consists simply of a piano melody and delicate strings. Additionally described as a wrenching, string-drenched ballad, the song features "angsty, unvarnished piano ballad." Perri stated that she does not know how to read or write sheet music, but knew how to perform certain piano chords, which were used in the song. In the singer's personal blog she released the piano chords of the entire song. The verse of the song is played in the chords Cm E♭ B♭ Fm; the pre-chorus in Fm A♭ E♭ B♭ Fm A♭ B♭sus; the chorus in E♭ B♭ Cm A♭ (A♭m) end with: E♭; the bridge in the chords Cm (right hand) Walk down C, B, B♭, A (bass note) A♭ G; and the outro finishes the song in the chords A♭ B F.

== Reception ==
=== Critical reception ===
"Jar of Hearts" received positive reviews from most critics. Kyle Anderson of MTV News positively reviewed the song as a "hook-heavy ballad," while reviewing Perri's rise to fame. Gavin Edwards of Rolling Stone described the song as "a wrenching, string-drenched ballad in which she delivers a kiss-off to an ex who won't stop hanging around." Megan Vick of Billboard gave the song a positive review stating that the simple piano chords of the song complement Perri's voice, which was additionally described as "A Fine Frenzy-esque." The Leeds UK based entertainment magazine/webzine, Contactmusic.com called the song a raw, defiant break-up song. Much less impressed, giving it two stars out of a possible five, Jody Rosen of Rolling Stone described the song as both insipid and bombastic.

John Hill of About.com broke the song down to understand the "instant hit" within the song. Hill stated that the song begins with weariness from the opening verse and builds up strength leading to the chorus of the song. Hill continued stating "There have been countless 'you did me wrong' songs through the history of pop music, but identifying a serial dater as a collector of broken hearts is one of the more unique ways of displaying both hurt and frustration," only to later conclude that the song is a bona fide hit and contains longevity making it an "impactful introduction" for Perri. Common Sense Media gave the song a rating of three-out-of-five stars, stating that although Perri is a "newcomer" to music, she proves that she can "hang with the big girls" with "Jar of Hearts", and said she was vocally superior both to Selena Gomez and Hayley Williams of Paramore. While reviewing the album, Chad Grischow of IGN described the song as a tender ballad containing a certain "magic" which fails to be recaptured by the rest of the album.

=== Chart performance ===
"Jar of Hearts" debuted at No. 28 on Billboard's Hot Digital Songs chart, No. 63 on the Billboard Hot 100, and No. 54 on the Canadian Hot 100, clocking 48,000 downloads, according to Nielsen SoundScan. After landing at No. 25 on the Hot 100, the track sold 200,000 downloads in three weeks. Spending twenty-three weeks on the Billboard Hot 100, the song peaked at number seventeen. Peaking at number fifteen after eleven weeks on the Pop Songs Chart, the ringtone version of the song has peaked at number twenty-one on the Ringtones chart after seven weeks. The song spent 72 weeks on the Hot Digital Songs chart, despite missing the top fifteen of the Hot 100. As of June 2014, the song has sold over 3,798,000 digital copies in the US alone,

Elsewhere, "Jar of Hearts" peaked at No. 2 in Australia and the Republic of Ireland, No. 3 in the Czech Republic and No. 4 in the United Kingdom and Finland. The song remained in the UK Singles Chart for 27 weeks.

== Music video ==
As a couple (Keltie Colleen) share an intimate moment in the car, her jar empties (below) as he collects the heart from it (above)

The music video for the song was directed by Jay Martin. A "Behind the scenes..." look was given into the recording of the music video on August 25, 2010. In the video, Perri states "I really hope that the video connects me to the song and entertains all of the fans of So You Think You Can Dance because it’s because of them that this even happened. I really hope that they love it. I hope that they love the dance…and that they just feel like we did this song justice with this video." So You Think You Can Dance contestants Allison Holker and Kathryn McCormick appear as dancers in the music video, performing choreography by Stacey Tookey.

The music video premiered on September 13, 2010, on Perri's YouTube channel. The video begins with Perri singing on a stoop while black petals fall from the sky. As Perri begins walking, a smoke reflection is shown over her chest, showing that her "jar" is empty - her heart is missing. As the song continues, Perri walks through different scenarios of hearts being collected, all by the same man, whose "jar" is being filled. This includes an intimate moment in a car and another in a phone booth, both of which leave the women whose hearts are stolen (through their mouths) with empty jars. They fall unconscious away from the collector, a young man with dark hair. Towards the end of the video, Perri is watching as the collector, the love-interest, collects more hearts while dancing with different women. The video ends with Perri stealing a heart from him, leaving his "jar" empty. He falls to the ground, and she appears to recuperate with her heart newly intact.

The music video was added to a list of "VH1’s Top 40 Music Videos Of 2010," "Jar of Hearts" coming in at number seventeen. During the premiere of Perri's "Daydream," VH1 compared it to the music video of "Jar of Hearts" stating that it took a more cinematic route that "relied heavily on slow motion to connote emotions."

== Live performances ==
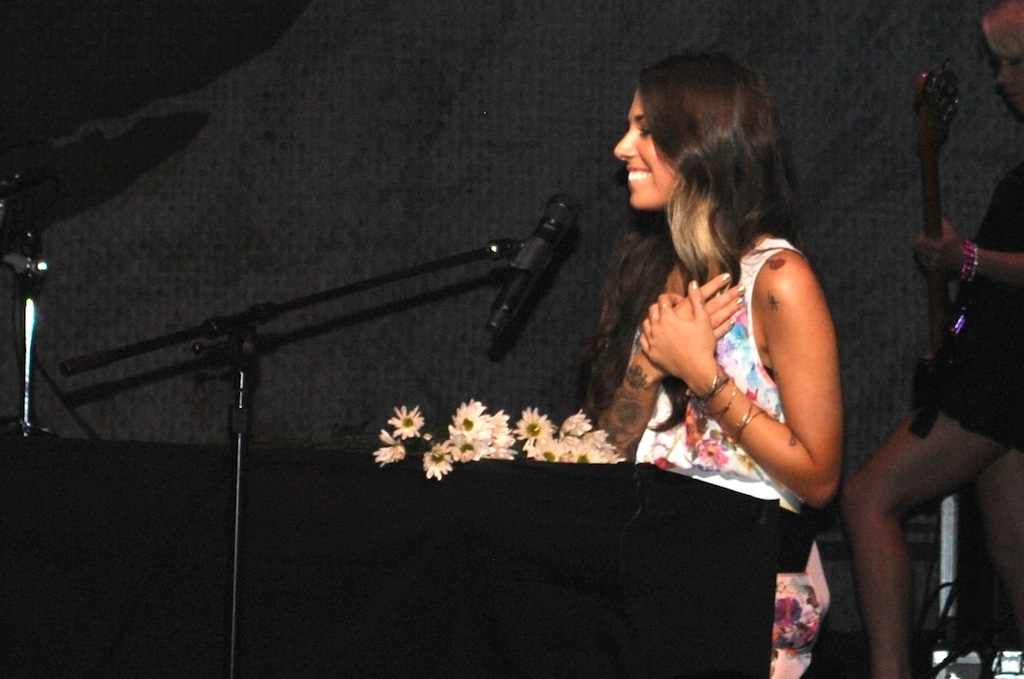
Perri performing "Jar of Hearts" in the Lovestrong Tour at the Centro de Bellas Artes in San Juan, Puerto Rico.

After premiering the song on So You Think You Can Dance, Perri returned to the stage on July 17, 2010, performing the song live for the first time. In an interview with Entertainment Weekly, Perri discussed her thoughts on performing on the show after premiering it on the same show, stating "I am very nervous, but very excited. It’s almost like my first child is 'So You Think You Can Dance'. I will do whatever they want me to do. And if it’s perform in front of millions of people, I’ll do that too. I’m pretty certain this is gonna be the biggest audience I’ve ever performed for." Perri has additionally performed the song live on and The Early Show on CBS and the Today Show on NBC in August 2012. On July 29, 2010, Perri also performed on The Tonight Show with Jay Leno, replacing Stone Temple Pilots who couldn't make it to the show on time. On December 7, 2010, Perri performed the song on Conan O'Brien's new show, Conan, with many critics naming the performance a career peak and stellar. On November 2, 2010, VH1 allowed Perri to perform the song, along with other tracks from her EP, in the elevator lobby as part of an ongoing "Live At VH1" series. The performances were recorded and shown through VH1's video-hosting sites. In October 2011, Perri performed the song live on The Late Late Show, an Irish chat show hosted by Ryan Tubridy. On November 13, 2011, Perri performed the song live on the Strictly Come Dancing Results Show. On January 29, 2012, Perri performed the song live on Dancing On Ice. On February 18, 2012, she performed the song before the world heavyweight boxing championship fight between Vitali Klitschko and Derek Chisora in Munich. Also Perri performed the song as part of the encore for her first tour Lovestrong Tour in 2011/12.

== Charts ==
=== Weekly charts ===
Chart (2010–2012)	Peak position
Australia (ARIA)	2
Austria (Ö3 Austria Top 40)	3
Belgium (Ultratip Bubbling Under Flanders)	28
Canada Hot 100 (Billboard)	21
Czech Republic Airplay (ČNS IFPI)	3
Finland (Suomen virallinen lista)	4
Germany (GfK)	5
Ireland (IRMA)	2
Israel International Airplay (Media Forest)	3
Japan (Japan Hot 100)	99
Luxembourg Digital Songs (Billboard)	2
Netherlands (Single Top 100)	52
New Zealand (Recorded Music NZ)	28
Scottish Singles Sales (Official Charts)	4
Slovakia Airplay (ČNS IFPI)	26
Switzerland (Schweizer Hitparade)	5
UK Singles (Official Charts)	4
US Billboard Hot 100	17
US Adult Contemporary (Billboard)	11
US Adult Pop Airplay (Billboard)	4
US Pop Airplay (Billboard)	15

=== Year-end charts ===
Chart (2011)	Position
Australia (ARIA)	16
Canada (Canadian Hot 100)	78
Ireland (IRMA)	8
UK Singles (OCC)	11
US Billboard Hot 100	55
US Adult Contemporary (Billboard)	23
US Adult Pop Airplay (Billboard)	20

Chart (2012)	Position
Austria (Ö3 Austria Top 40)	24
Germany (Official German Charts)	28
Switzerland (Schweizer Hitparade)	26
UK Singles (OCC)	105

== Certifications ==
Region	Certification	Certified units/sales
Australia (ARIA)	3× Platinum	210,000^{^}
Austria (IFPI Austria)	Platinum	30,000^{*}
Canada (Music Canada)	2× Platinum	160,000^{*}
Denmark (IFPI Danmark)	Gold	45,000^{‡}
Germany (BVMI)	Platinum	300,000^{^}
New Zealand (RMNZ)	2× Platinum	60,000^{‡}
Switzerland (IFPI Switzerland)	2× Platinum	60,000^{^}
United Kingdom (BPI)	3× Platinum	1,800,000^{‡}
United States (RIAA)	7× Platinum	7,000,000^{‡}
^{*} Sales figures based on certification alone.^{^} Shipments figures based on certification alone.^{‡} Sales+streaming figures based on certification alone.

== In popular culture ==
- In July 2011, Fitzy and Wippa, from the Australian radio station Nova 96.9 made a parody of the song called "Jar of Hoons".

== See also ==
- List of million-selling singles in the United Kingdom
