= SMAC =

SMAC may refer to:

== Biology and medicine ==
- Second mitochondria-derived activator of caspases or Diablo homolog, a component of the apoptosis pathway
- Sequential Multiple Analysis - Computer or comprehensive metabolic panel, a panel of clinical chemistry lab tests
- Supramolecular activation cluster, the structure comprising the immunological synapse

== Other uses ==
- Sabang Merauke Raya Air Charter, an Indonesian airline
- Sarah McCreanor, known professionally as Smac
- Sid Meier's Alpha Centauri, a computer game
- Social Mobile Analytics Cloud, also called the third platform
- Southern Maryland Athletic Conference
- Southwestern Michigan Athletic Conference
- Stone Mountain Arts Center, an arts center in Brownville, Maine, United States, North America
- Supreme Macedonian-Adrianople Committee

== See also ==
- FBi SMAC Awards, Awards given by Sydney radio station FBi
- Smack (disambiguation)
