= So You Think You Can Dance (American TV series) season 16 =

Sixteenth (2019) season of the American reality show dance competition

So You Think You Can Dance
- Season 16
- Hosted by: Cat Deeley
- Judges: Nigel Lythgoe; Mary Murphy; Laurieann Gibson; Dominic "D-Trix" Sandoval
- Winner: Bailey Muñoz
- Runner-up: Mariah Russell

Release
- Original network: Fox Broadcasting Company
- Original release: June 3 – September 16, 2019

Season chronology
- ← Previous; Season 15 Next → Season 17

The sixteenth season of So You Think You Can Dance (SYTYCD), an American dance competition reality show on FOX, returned on June 3, 2019. The series has won numerous awards since its debut in 2005, including eleven Emmy Awards for Outstanding Choreography, the most for any show. This panel of judges again features series creator Nigel Lythgoe, as well as the return of ballroom dance champion and expert Mary Murphy. New to the panel are choreographer Laurieann Gibson and B-boy dancer/choreographer Dominic "D-Trix" Sandoval, who serve as the third and fourth judges during auditions and live shows. Cat Deeley continues in her role as host for a fifteenth consecutive season, for which she has earned five Emmy Award nominations. The grand prize is $250,000, (Note: This amount has remained unchanged since season three in 2007: Benji Schwimmer won $100,000 in season two in 2006, plus a hybrid SUV; in the series' debut in 2005, winner Nick Lazzarini received $100,000, and the use of a Manhattan penthouse apartment for a year which he exchanged for the cash equivalent.) a cover article in Dance Spirit, and the title of "America's Favorite Dancer". This is the final season to feature Lythgoe and Murphy as judges and the only season to feature Gibson and Sandoval as judges.

In the first five episodes, the Judges' Auditions featured about six full performances each along with the judges' critiques, as well as montages of other contestants. From those auditions, a pool of eighty-three contestants, (Note: originally reported in episode six as seventy-nine contestants) who each earned a Golden Ticket advancing them to The Academy where they face, in the next episodes, six Academy Rounds that winnow down to the Top Ten—both gender: five women and five men—for the studio shows.

In episode ten, and for the rest of the season, the Studio Performance Shows showcase the contestants in solos, duets, and group numbers, as they vie to connect with viewers who vote for their favorites. The following week, at the end of the show, the two women and two men (both gender) with the lowest vote totals will be up for elimination. The judges decide which woman and man: 1 in each gender will be cut.

On September 16, 2019, Bailey Muñoz was crowned "America's Favorite Dancer" and became the only b-boy contestant to win the title in the show's history. A forty-stop tour featuring the Top Ten contestants and two All-stars started soon after the finale and ran until December 2019. Muñoz and fellow grand finalist Mariah Russell, who were paired as a couple from the first performance episode, became the forty-first contestants in the show's run never to face elimination from being among the bottom four contestants, became the thirty-second contestants to be in the grand finale, and became the sixth pair in the show's run never to face elimination from being among the bottom four contestants in the grand finale and became the second original couple who were the final two without being in the bottom four and the second season that the top four were never in the danger zone.

== Judges' Auditions ==
Madison Jordan, an eventual Top Six contestants, shared that she submitted her online video in January and was contacted a month later to in-person auditions. Those auditions, for contestants ages eighteen to thirty, took place with producers in: New York on February 9, 2019; Dallas on February 12; and Los Angeles on February 23. From these, approximately 130 contestants were chosen by the producers to audition in Hollywood in March before the panel of judges.

In addition to the new judges, the televised auditions have been revamped so instead of remote tryouts, the contestants come to the new SYTYCD Hollywood studio, outfitted with 120 cameras surrounding the stage, allowing the movement to be "frozen" in time, like bullet time. Another change is the addition of a studio audience instead of being just the rest of audition contestants and their supporters.

The five episodes of Judges' Auditions each featured about six full-length dance routines; with an introduction package about the contestant, critique, and vote from the judging panel. Only a few of those were excluded from moving to The Academy Rounds; the successful audition contestants were given a "Golden Ticket" to the Academy. In addition, montages of auditions were also mixed in with the full ones, showing a mix of some voted through.

Some of the episodes were also themed; episode four featured various couple configurations including identical twin eighteen-year-old contemporary contestants Trent and Colton Edwards.

== The Academy ==
The Academy Rounds, filmed in April, started in episode six at the Dolby Theatre in Hollywood, California with the eighty-three contestants who made it through the Judges’ Auditions to get a Golden Ticket by excelling in a dance style of their choice. (Note: originally reported in episode six as seventy-nine contestants) Over three days they will go through four Choreography Rounds of The Academy; rehearsing new dance routines, from a professional choreographer, en masse for ninety minutes.

They then face the original four judges, in small groups, who can: pass them through; have them “dance for their lives”; or be cut from the competition. Of those that started: approximately only one in four, or twenty (ten women, and ten men in each gender) will make it to the Top Twenty; and they will face The Final Cut, with only half (five women, and five men in each gender) going through to the Top Ten studio performance shows.

=== Choreography Rounds ===
The four Choreography Rounds were:

1. Hip-hop dance taught by Luther Brown: he was looking for the contestants to have precision in the moves, energy, and star quality. They performed to the dancehall song “Boasty” by rappers Wiley and Stefflon Don with Jamaican singer Sean Paul featuring Idris Elba;
2. Ballroom dance taught by Emma Slater, and Sasha Farber: they taught a “sassy, intricate” cha-cha-cha with “lots of tricks” to the song “Free, Free, Free” by Pitbull featuring Theron Theron. The choreographers looked for fun, and a noticeable “connection with [the] partner”;
3. Contemporary dance taught by Talia Favia: she taught her “fast, and challenging” routine that is “athletic, but with an emotional part [one] must feel”. It's performed to “Moments Passed” by Dermot Kennedy.
4. The Group Round with Mandy Moore, assisted by All-Star Robert Roldan from season 7: Moore, for a first in the show's history, reworked the three previous rounds’ choreography into a new group number; to a different song, a breakdown remix of “Dance to the Music” by Sly and the Family Stone. Moore looks for the same quality needed to compete in the Studio Shows, the ability to “push” even when injured, exhausted, or mentally drained.

The Academy's first three rounds were shown in episode six. Day One started with the Hip-hop Round, after which ten of the eighty-three contestants who started are cut, including Trent, one of the identical twins. Day Two, the Ballroom Round cuts another fifteen contestants including: Colton, the other identical twin; and Sarah “Smac” McCreanor, a jazz contestant who wowed the judges as a comedic performing contestant, but whose dancing was not at a high enough standard for the season.

Episode seven picks up in the middle of the Contemporary Round, where fifty-four contestants faced more cuts: including Jay Jackson, a contemporary contestant, and drag queen, who competed in drag last year but opted not to this time; and Jarrod Tyler Paulson, who is in a romantic relationship with fellow contestant Madison Jordan, who advanced to the Top Twenty. Day Three sees the forty-three remaining contestants take on The Group Round: the judges do their cuts by seeing the contestants grouped by their dance genres; eleven contestants are cut, leaving thirty-three contestants.

=== The Final Cuts ===
The Academy Week finishes with the last two Academy Rounds: The Solo Round features each of the remaining thirty-three contestants dancing a solo in their own genre, thirteen are cut, and the Top Twenty are revealed; while The Final Cut pares the contestants down to ten contestants.

In episode eight and nine, we will see The Final Cut coverage. Each contestant will be paired with a SYTYCD All-Star, and choreographer, to rehearse a duet outside the contestant's genre. In episode eight the Top Ten girls compete, the Top Ten boys (each gender) compete the following week in episode nine. The five contestants going through will be announced each night.

==== Top Ten Girls ====
In order of appearance in episode eight: (Note: age as of air date, as noted by SYTYCD.)

Contestant	Style	Music	Choreographer(s)	Result
Mariah Russell; Jonathan Platero	Salsa	"La Malanga" — Mercadonegro	Oksana Platero	Advanced
Melany Mercedes; Fik-Shun	Hip Hop	"Get Silly" — V.I.C.	Randi & Hef	Eliminated
Ashley Sanchez; Lex Ishimoto	Contemporary	"lovely" — Billie Eilish & Khalid	Jaci Royal	Eliminated
Anna Linstruth; Marko Germar	Jazz	"Backwardz" — Junglebae	Ray Leeper	Advanced
Madison Jordan; Kiki Nyemchek	Cha Cha	"Bola Rebola" — Tropkillaz, J Balvin & Anitta feat. Mc Zaac	Sasha Farber & Emma Slater	Advanced
Sofia Ghavami; Marko Germar	Jazz	"Rinse & Repeat" — Riton feat. Kah-Lo	Spencer Liff	Eliminated
Sumi Oshima; Lex Ishimoto	Contemporary	"Angels" — The xx	Talia Favia	Eliminated
Nazz Sldryan; Fik-Shun	Hip Hop	"Overseas" — Desiigner feat. Lil Pump	Luther Brown	Eliminated
Sophie Pittman; Kiki Nyemchek	Cha Cha	"Burnin' Up" — Jessie J feat. 2 Chainz	Sharna Burgess	Advanced
Stephanie Sosa; Robert Roldan	Contemporary	"You Say" — Lauren Daigle	Mandy Moore	Advanced

==== Top Ten Boys ====
In order of appearance in episode nine: (Note: age as of air date, as noted by SYTYCD.)

Contestant	Style	Music	Choreographer(s)	Result
Bailey Muñoz; Lauren Froderman	Contemporary	"Fire on Fire" — Sam Smith	Jaci Royal	Advanced
Ezra Sosa; Comfort Fedoke	Hip Hop	"We Outta Here!" — Lil Yachty feat. Young Nudy	Luther Brown	Advanced
Vlad Kvartin; Melanie Moore	Contemporary	"You Are the Reason" — Calum Scott	Mandy Moore	Eliminated
Aleksandr Ostanin; Lindsay Arnold	Cha Cha	"Sax" — Fleur East	Sharna Burgess	Eliminated
Benjamin Castro; Koine Iwasaki	Salsa	"Papi chulo... Te traigo el Mmm 2k16-Bombaton" — Lorna	Oksana Platero	Advanced
Bryan "Clocks" Volozanin; Jasmine Harper	Jazz	"Take It" — Dom Dolla	Spencer Liff	Eliminated
Brandon Talbot; Lindsay Arnold	Cha Cha	"Vivir Mi Vida (Yo Fred Remix)" — Marc Anthony	Sasha Farber & Emma Slater	Eliminated
Nathan Cherry; Melanie Moore	Contemporary	"Weightless" —Adam French	Talia Favia	Eliminated
Gino Cosculluela; Lauren Froderman	Jazz	"That's It (I'm Crazy)" — Sofi Tukker	Ray Leeper	Advanced
Eddie Hoyt; Comfort Fedoke	Hip Hop	"Treadmill" — LightSkinKeisha	Randi & Hef	Advanced

== Top Ten contestants ==
The Top Ten contestants are: (Note: Ages as of July 2019, as noted by SYTYCD.)

- Benjamin Castro: 18, from Miami, Florida, is a contemporary contestant. He was born in Chile, and immigrated when he was two. He has been dancing since he was five, and is close to his large extended family: his cousin Ruby was on season 13; he trained with his uncle Manny, who along with his wife Lory, are “owners, directors, teachers and choreographers” of Dancetown studio.
- Gino Cosculluela: 18, from Miami, Florida, is a contemporary contestant. His older brother and sister are both professional dancers. He's been dancing since he was very young, first tagging along to his sister's classes before being enrolled in a hip hop class. In 2012 he and his siblings appeared on season 7 of America's Got Talent as the dance trio "The Cos Fam," they were eliminated before the Live Shows. In 2013-2014 he was a recurring dancer on seasons 3, and 4 of Dance Moms; he made a guest appearance in 2016 on season 6. After the SYTYCD tour he is dancing on Broadway in a revival of West Side Story opening in December 2019.
- Eddie Hoyt: 19, from Buscawen, New Hampshire, is an Irish-American tap contestant. He was homeschooled and had few friends as a child. His first dance was a highland dance when he was seven. During his freshman year of homeschooling, he came out as gay, which was a difficult experience for him having grown up in a religious family. He had previously auditioned for Season 15, but in the end, was cut just before the top twenty were chosen. He moved to Utah to train, and become the tap director at Center Stage Performing Arts Studio in Orem.
- Madison Jordan: 21, from Lake Elmo, Minnesota, is a contemporary contestant. She has alopecia which has toughened her; the disease made her hair fall out when she was seven, and she dealt with bullying because of that. She wore wigs up until 2017 when she opted to forego them. She trained at Larkin Dance Studio (LDS) in Maplewood, Minnesota, which has a reputation for training dancers with careers on Broadway and in Hollywood. She trained at LDS for fifteen years—starting when she was three, and until she graduated high school—and it is where she met her boyfriend Jarrod Paulson. She went to college at the University of Minnesota where she was a cheerleader. She danced with Crash Dance Productions (CDP), a Twin Cities contemporary dance company. She reconnected with Paulson at CPD and he also competed this season but was cut during the Academy rounds.
- Anna Linstruth: 19, from Las Vegas, Nevada, is a hip hop contestant. She was born and raised in Lancaster, California, where she helped raise horses. She took up hip hop dancing after she moved, and now teaches the genre.
- Bailey ‘Bailrok’ Muñoz: 18, is Filipino-American from Las Vegas, Nevada and is a B-boy contestant. He was born in the San Francisco Bay Area, several months prematurely—weighing four pounds and four ounces—and dealt with severe health issues for seven years because of the condition. In first grade he discovered his love for performing. In 2010, at age nine, he was a semi-finalist in the dance duo Future FunK on America's Got Talent. (Note: He has made appearances on: Dancing with the Stars; and Disney's Shake It Up and Austin and Ally.) He has toured as a dancer with: Justin Bieber's "Purpose Tour"; Macy's Passport with Robin Thicke, and CeeLo Green; Bruno Mars; Beyoncé; and with Meghan Trainor. He was the youngest members of the Rock Steady Crew when he joined. He performs on the Las Vegas Strip at Rose.Rabbit.Lie. joining the ensemble just after middle school; his smaller stature helps him as he dances atop a grand piano. Up to competing on SYTYCD he had not had a female dancing partner. He has attended Las Vegas Academy of the Arts, and is on break from University of Nevada, Las Vegas.
- Sophie Pittman: 18, from Collierville, Tennessee, is a contemporary contestant. She's been dancing since she was three, and trained at Studio 413. She has three younger siblings, and graduated high school in May 2019. Her father is a physical therapist who helped her learn to “stretch, recover and monitor her nutrition.”
- Mariah Russell: 19, from Nashville, Tennessee, is a contemporary contestant. She first started classes at age seven, and in dance competitions when she was nine. She's trained at Creswell Middle School of the Arts, Nashville School of the Arts, and DC Dance Factory in Franklin which as of September 2019, has had six students go on to be SYTYCD finalists. She grew up in a single-parent family but her mom is now engaged to be married; her fiancé also supports Mariah's dance career.
- Ezra Sosa: 18, from Provo, Utah, is a ballroom contestant. He comes from a dancing family including his sister, a fellow finalist.
- Stephanie Sosa: 19, from Salt Lake City, Utah, is a ballroom contestant. She made it to the top twenty in 2018, but was cut before the Top Ten. She said this last year has been difficult as her mom had a stroke. She's appearing in High School Musical: The Musical: The Series on Disney+ starting in November 2019.

=== Female contestants ===
Contestant	Age	Home Town	Dance Style	Elimination date	Placement
Mariah Russell	19	Nashville, Tennessee	Contemporary	September 16, 2019	Runner-Up
Sophie Pittman	18	Collierville, Tennessee	Contemporary	September 16, 2019	4th Place
Madison Jordan	21	Lake Elmo, Minnesota	Contemporary	September 2, 2019	Top 6
Anna Linstruth	19	Las Vegas, Nevada	Hip-Hop	August 26, 2019	Top 8
Stephanie Sosa	19	Salt Lake City, Utah	Ballroom	August 19, 2019	Top 10

=== Male contestants ===
Contestant	Age	Home Town	Dance Style	Elimination date	Placement
Bailey Muñoz	18	Las Vegas, Nevada	B-Boy	September 16, 2019	Winner
Gino Cosculluela	18	Miami, Florida	Contemporary	September 16, 2019	3rd Place
Ezra Sosa	18	Provo, Utah	Ballroom	September 2, 2019	Top 6
Benjamin Castro	18	Miami, Florida	Contemporary	August 26, 2019	Top 8
Eddie Hoyt	19	Boscawen, New Hampshire	Tap	August 19, 2019	Top 10

== Elimination chart ==
Contestants are listed in chronological order of elimination.

Legend
Female	Male	Bottom 4 contestants	Eliminated

Result show date:	8/19	8/26	9/2	9/16
Contestant	Results			
Bailey Muñoz				Winner
Mariah Russell				Runner-Up
Gino Cosculluela				3rd Place
Sophie Pittman				4th Place
Madison Jordan		Btm 4	Elim	
Ezra Sosa	Btm 4	Btm 4	Elim	
Benjamin Castro		Elim		
Anna Linstruth	Btm 4	Elim		
Eddie Hoyt	Elim			
Stephanie Sosa	Elim			

== Studio shows ==
The Academy Rounds took place in April, the contestants had a few months off to practice as the live shows did not begin filming until August. The rest of the season consists of the studio shows—taped in front of a live audience on Saturdays, then aired the following Monday; with the exception of the finale, which was broadcast live—sending home contestants based on viewer votes to determine "America's favorite dancer". Contestant Sophie Pittman shared the experience can be "kind of nerve-racking because we don't know what to expect". According to Barbara Muñoz, mother of another contestant, Bailey, contestants "draw from a hat what genre and choreographer they're paired with". The contestants are in rehearsal Tuesday through Saturday, "more than eight hours a day with professional choreographers", with new styles each week and usually one or more pairs.

=== Top Ten Perform: Round 1 (August 12, 2019) ===
- Group Routine: Top 10: "This Is Me" — Kesha (Contemporary; Choreographer: Mandy Moore)

Contestants	Style	Music	Choreographer(s)
Mariah Russell; Bailey Muñoz	Jazz	"Love Shack" — The B-52's	Mandy Moore
Stephanie Sosa; Gino Cosculluela	Hip Hop	"Ice Me Out" — Kash Doll	Luther Brown
Anna Linstruth; Benjamin Castro	Cha Cha	"We Run the Night" — Havana Brown	Sasha Farber & Emma Slater
Madison Jordan; Ezra Sosa	Contemporary	"Lost" — Dermot Kennedy	Talia Favia
Sophie Pittman; Eddie Hoyt	Jazz Funk	"Sushi" — Merk & Kremont	Brian Friedman
Madison Jordan; Anna Linstruth; Sophie Pittman; Mariah Russell; Stephanie Sosa	Contemporary	"Saint Honesty" — Sara Bareilles	Travis Wall
Benjamin Castro; Gino Cosculluela; Eddie Hoyt; Bailey Muñoz; Ezra Sosa	Hip Hop	"Drop" — Smokepurpp	Luther Brown

=== Top Ten Perform: Round 2 (August 19, 2019) ===
- Group Routine: Top 10: "Sign of the Times" — Harry Styles (Contemporary; Choreographer: Travis Wall)

Couple	Style	Music	Choreographer(s)	Result
Stephanie Sosa	Jive	"Long Tall Sally (The Thing)" — Little Richard	Sasha Farber & Emma Slater	Eliminated
Gino Cosculluela	Jive	"Long Tall Sally (The Thing)" — Little Richard	Sasha Farber & Emma Slater	Safe
Sophie Pittman	Contemporary	"when the party's over" — Billie Eilish	Travis Wall	Safe
Eddie Hoyt	Contemporary	"when the party's over" — Billie Eilish	Travis Wall	Eliminated
Anna Linstruth	Hip Hop	"Lottery" —K Camp	Randi & Hef	Bottom 4
Benjamin Castro	Hip Hop	"Lottery" —K Camp	Randi & Hef	Safe
Madison Jordan	Jazz	"You Can Leave Your Hat On" — Joe Cocker	Ray Leeper	Safe
Ezra Sosa	Jazz	"You Can Leave Your Hat On" — Joe Cocker	Ray Leeper	Bottom 4
Mariah Russell	Hip Hop	"Tempo" — Lizzo feat. Missy Elliott	Luther Brown	Safe
Bailey Muñoz	Hip Hop	"Tempo" — Lizzo feat. Missy Elliott	Luther Brown	Safe

=== Top Eight ===
The Top Eight show marks a format change to a two-hour show. Each contestant will dance five times: a solo; two duets; and two group numbers including the opening; before the elimination at the end.

Top Eight group number:

Choreographed by Jonathan and Oksana Platero, the number is a mash-up of Latin/Rhythm dances to "Himno del Carnaval", by District 78 featuring Agina. Afterwards host Cat Deeley alluded to this episode going "around the world", with later numbers presenting dance styles from Africa, Polynesia, and South America. Dance Spirit's Alison Feller noted the series has gone "above and beyond" to "bring worldly dance forms to the small screen".

Couple	Style	Music	Choreographer(s)	Result
Anna Linstruth; Benjamin Castro	Tahitian	"Maua Taki" — Te Vaka	Tiana Liufau	Eliminated
Anna Linstruth; Benjamin Castro	Broadway	"I'll Be Seeing You" — Tank and the Bangas	Al Blackstone	Eliminated
Madison Jordan; Ezra Sosa	Hip Hop	"Space" — Dizzee Rascal	Randi & Hef	Bottom 4
Madison Jordan; Ezra Sosa	Argentine Tango	"Despues Que Te Fuiste (A Daniel Berard)" — Pepe Motta	Miriam Larici & Leonardo Barrionuevo	Bottom 4
Mariah Russell; Bailey Muñoz	Cha Cha	"Ce Soir (Hugel remix)" — El Profesor feat. Laura White	Dmitry Chaplin	Safe
Mariah Russell; Bailey Muñoz	Contemporary	"Slide" — James Bay	Mandy Korpinen & Elizabeth Petrin	Safe
Sophie Pittman; Gino Cosculluela	Contemporary	"You Will Be Found" — Dear Evan Hansen	KC Monnie	Safe
Sophie Pittman; Gino Cosculluela	Jazz	"T-R-O-U-B-L-E" — Elvis Presley	Jonathon Redavid	Safe
Benjamin Castro; Gino Cosculluela; Madison Jordan; Mariah Russell	Contemporary	"bad guy" — Billie Eilish	Talia Favia	
Anna Linstruth; Bailey Muñoz; Sophie Pittman; Ezra Sosa	African Jazz	"Rebirth" — Lord KraVen	Sean Cheesman	

Top 8 contestant's solos performed in their own style

Contestant	Style	Music
Sophie Pittman	Contemporary	"Skin" — Jamie Woon
Gino Cosculluela	Contemporary	"Burn" — Andra Day
Madison Jordan	Contemporary	"Celophane" — FKA Twigs
Ezra Sosa	Latin Ballroom	"Conga" — Gloria Estefan and the Miami Sound Machine
Mariah Russell	Contemporary	"Somebody" — Emeli Sandé
Bejamin Castro	Contemporary	"Run Boy Run" — Woodkid
Anna Linstruth	Hip Hop	"bellyache (Marian Hill Remix)" — Billie Eilish
Bailey Muñoz	Breakdancing	"Let's Shut Up & Dance" — Jason Derulo, LAY & NCT 127

=== Top Six ===
The Top Six contestants sees the introduction of the All-stars (AS) into the opening group number, and as duet pairs for the first round. Choreographer Mandy Moore noted that using the AS forces the contestants to quickly develop a connection with a new pairs. Each contestants will perform: a solo; two duets, one with an AS, and one with their contestants partner; and two group numbers, the opening number, and a trio.

Host Cat Deeley shared that last week's vote was the biggest of the season. The judges know the results and will base their elimination decisions on the Top Six performances.

Top Six group number:

Choreographed by Christopher "Pharside" Jennings & Krystal "Phoenix" Meraz the opening group included the six contestants as well as six All-stars doing a contemporary piece to "Down" by District 78 featuring Alexandra Senior.

Duets

Contestants	Style	Music	Choreographer(s)	Result
Bailey Muñoz; Koine Iwasaki	Broadway	"Mambo Italiano" — Dean Martin	Al Blackstone	Top 4
Gino Cosculluela; Comfort Fedoke	Hip Hop	"Get Up" — Ciara feat. Chamillionaire	Luther Brown	Top 4
Madison Jordan; Lex Ishimoto	Jazz	"Can't Rely on You" —Paloma Faith	Mandy Moore	Eliminated
Sophie Pittman; Kiki Nyemchek	Samba	"Shape of You" — Ed Sheeran	Pasha Kovalev	Top 4
Mariah Russell; Fik-Shun	Hip Hop	"We Gonna Win" — Miri Ben-Ari & Styles P.	Misha Gabriel	Top 4
Ezra Sosa; Gaby Diaz	Contemporary	"Ne me quitte pas" — Jacques Brel	Robert Roldan (season 7)	Eliminated
Sophie Pittman; Gino Cosculluela	Broadway	"Down With Love" — Holly Palmer & Michael Bublé	Warren Carlyle	
Mariah Russell; Bailey Muñoz	Pop Jazz	"Need You Tonight" — INXS	Ray Leeper	
Madison Jordan; Ezra Sosa	Disco	"You Make Me Feel (Mighty Real)" — Sylvester	Doriana Sanchez	
Madison Jordan; Sophie Pittman; Mariah Russell	Jazz	"I Can't Stand the Rain (2015 Remastered Version)" — Tina Turner	Ray Leeper	
Gino Cosculluela; Bailey Muñoz; Ezra Sosa	Contemporary	"Amen (LVC Choir)" — Amber Run	Talia Favia	

Top 6 contestant's solos

Dancer	Style	Music
Mariah Russell	Contemporary	"Loved by You" — KIRBY
Ezra Sosa	Jive	"Runaway Baby" — Bruno Mars
Bailey Muñoz	Breakdancing	"Writing's on the Wall" — Sam Smith
Madison Jordan	Contemporary	"Lost" — Anouk
Sophie Pittman	Contemporary	"Ain't No Way" — Shoshana Bean
Gino Cosculluela	Contemporary	"Missing You" — Blake McGrath

=== Top Four ===
The Top Four is the last night of the competition, and sees the continuation of the All-stars (AS) in the opening group number, and as duet partners. Next week's finale showcases the Top Ten in favorite performances from the season. Each contestants will perform: a solo; four duets, one with an AS, and one with each of the other contestants; and the opening number. The votes from this week will be combined with last week's to reveal the winner in the finale.

Top Four group number:

Choreographed by Mandy Moore the opening group included the contestants as well as AS doing a contemporary piece inspired by Cats, the movie based on the musical of the same name, premiering in December 2019; the performance used a medley inspired by the movie's music.

Duets

Couple	Style	Music	Choreographer(s)
Sophie Pittman; Gino Cosculluela	Jazz	"All Nite (Don't Stop) [Sander Kleinberg's Everybody Club Mix]" — Janet Jackson	Ray Leeper
Mariah Russell; Bailey Muñoz	Smooth Jazz	"16 Tons" — LeAnn Rimes	Jonathon Redavid
Sophie Pittman; Marko Germar	Contemporary	"90 Days" — P!nk feat. Wrabel	Talia Favia
Bailey Muñoz; Comfort Fedoke	Hip Hop	"Tell Me When To Go" — E-40 feat. Keak da Sneak	Luther Brown
Mariah Russell; Gino Cosculluela	Quickstep	"Bad Boy, Good Man" — Tape Five feat. Henrik Wager	Sharna Burgess & Artem Chigvintsev
Sophie Pittman; Bailey Muñoz	Bollywood	"Butterfly" —Pritam (from Jab Harry Met Sejal)	Nakul dev Mahajan
Gino Cosculluela; Melanie Moore	Contemporary	"Someone You Loved" — Lewis Capaldi	Jaci Royal
Mariah Russell; Robert Roldan	Contemporary	"Grey" — Ani DiFranco	Mandy Moore
Gino Cosculluela; Bailey Muñoz	Broadway	"The Girl from Ipanema" —Nat King Cole & Gregory Porter	Al Blackstone
Sophie Pittman; Mariah Russell	Hip Hop	"Sally Walker" — Iggy Azalea	Luther Brown

Top 4 contestant's solos

Contestant	Style	Music	Result
Gino Cosculluela	Contemporary	"I Don't Know My Own Strength" — Andrea Faustini	3rd Place
Sophie Pittman	Contemporary	"Try a Little Tenderness" — Otis Redding	4th Place
Mariah Russell	Contemporary	"If You Let Me" — Sinéad Harnett feat. GRADES	Runner-Up
Bailey Muñoz	Breakdancing	"Don't Touch Me (Throw da Water on 'Em)" — Busta Rhymes	Winner

== Ratings ==
=== U.S. Nielsen ratings ===
Show	Episode	First air date	Rating (18–49)	Share (18–49)	Viewers (millions)	Rank (timeslot)	Rank (night)
1	Auditions #1	June 3, 2019	0.7	4	2.70	1	3 (tied)
2	Auditions #2	June 10, 2019	0.6	3	2.48	2	4 (tied)
3	Auditions #3	June 17, 2019	0.5	3	2.06	1	7 (tied)
4	Auditions #4	June 24, 2019	0.5	3	2.09	1	4 (tied)
5	Auditions #5	July 8, 2019	0.5	3	2.14	1	5 (tied)
6	Academy #1	July 15, 2019	0.5	3	1.91	1	5 (tied)
7	Academy #2	July 22, 2019	0.4	2	1.92	1	5 (tied)
8	Final Cut - The Top Ten Girls	July 29, 2019	0.4	2	1.91 (Note: Although TV by the Numbers reported the number of viewers as 1.19 million, it is clearly a typo with the final two digits switched: the preliminary results were 1.91 million, with Fox's average for the night being 2.10 million (the other Fox show, Beat Shazam, was at 2.30 million), while with the final results the Fox average for the night remained 2.10 million, with Beat Shazam at 2.29 million, so 1.91 is the missing number for the average to work; the average would have dropped to 1.74 million if 1.19 was the correct figure.)	1	5 (tied)
9	Final Cut - The Top Ten Guys	August 5, 2019	0.4	3	1.95	2	5 (tied)
10	Top 10 Perform, Round 1	August 12, 2019	0.5	3	2.25	1	5 (tied)
11	Top 10 Perform, Round 2	August 19, 2019	0.5	3	2.30	2	4 (tied)
12	Top 8 Perform	August 26, 2019	0.4	2	2.08	4	5 (tied)
13	Top 6 Perform	September 2, 2019	0.4	2	1.83	4	4 (tied)
14	Top 4 Perform	September 9, 2019	0.4	2	1.93	4	4 (tied)
15	Season Finale	September 16, 2019	0.4	2	1.93	4	5 (tied)

== So You Think You Can Dance Live! 2019 tour ==
In July 2019, the So You Think You Can Dance Live! 2019 tour was announced. The forty-stop tour starts October 12 in Atlantic City, New Jersey—covering the U.S., with two Canadian stops—and ends December 6, 2019, in Reno, Nevada.

The Top Ten contestants will be among the performers, which will also include two SYTYCD All-Stars: Lauren Froderman, season seven winner; and Cyrus "Glitch" Spencer, season nine contestant. The concert will feature some of the current season's most popular routines and also include original works created for the tour.

== National Dance Day ==
The 10th anniversary of National Dance Day (September 21), an event started by SYTYCD creator and lead judge Nigel Lythgoe's American Dance Movement (formerly the Dizzy Feet Foundation) was announced for several weeks. The official routine choreography is by Matt Steffanina to “Electricity” by Dua Lipa.

== See also ==
- Glossary of partner dance terms
- Glossary of dance moves
- List of So You Think You Can Dance finalists
- National Dance Day (September 21)
