= So You Think You Can Dance (American TV series) season 15 =

So You Think You Can Dance
- Season 15
- Hosted by: Cat Deeley
- Judges: Nigel Lythgoe; Mary Murphy; Vanessa Hudgens; Stephen "tWitch" Boss
- Winner: Hannahlei Cabanilla
- Runner-up: Jensen Arnold

Release
- Original network: Fox Broadcasting Company
- Original release: June 4 – September 10, 2018

Season chronology
- ← Previous; Season 14 Next → Season 16

So You Think You Can Dance, an American dance competition show, returned for its fifteenth season on Monday, June 4, 2018. The season's judge panel once again features series creator Nigel Lythgoe, as well as the return of ballroom expert Mary Murphy, and Vanessa Hudgens, while Season 4 runner-up Stephen "tWitch" Boss is the new fourth judge during the auditions and the live shows. Cat Deeley continues in her role as host for a fourteenth consecutive season. This is the last season to feature Hudgens as judge.

== Auditions ==
Open auditions for season 15 were held in two cities beginning in March 2018. During the auditions, the judges were joined by special guest judge, Stephen "tWitch" Boss.

Air Date	Audition Venue	City	Audition Date
June 18 & 25, 2018	Gelsey Kirkland Academy of Classical Ballet	Brooklyn, NY	March 2–4, 2018
June 4 & 11, 2018	Wallis Annenberg Center for the Performing Arts	Los Angeles, CA	March 26–28, 2018

== The Academy ==
=== Top 20 contestants ===
Below comprises those who have advanced into the initial top twenty contestants (both gender: ten female contestants and ten male contestants), until this year's "twist" which ultimately cut the contestants roster going to the live shows in half.

=== Female Contestants ===
Top Ten Female	Dance Style
Dayna Madison	Jazz
Brianna Penrose	Tap
Stephanie Sosa	Latin Ballroom
Sydney Moss	Contemporary
Emily Carr	Contemporary

=== Male Contestants ===
Top Ten Male	Dance Style
Justin Pham	Contemporary
Peyton Albrecht	Contemporary
Kyle Bennett, Jr.	Animation
Dustin Payne	Animation
Allen Genkin	Ballroom

== Contestants ==
=== Top 10 contestants ===
==== Female contestants ====
Contestant	Age	Home town	Dance style	Placement
Hannahlei Cabanilla	18	Anaheim Hills, California	Contemporary	Winner
Jensen Arnold	20	Provo, Utah	Latin Ballroom	Runner-Up
Genessy Castillo	18	Jamaica, New York	Contemporary	3rd Place
Magda Fialek	27	Nowy Sacz, Poland	Latin Ballroom	Top 8
Chelsea Hough	24	Nashville, Tennessee	Jazz	Top 10

==== Male contestants ====
Contestant	Age	Home town	Dance style	Placement
Slavik Pustovoytov	19	Poltava, Ukraine	Hip Hop/Animation	4th Place
Jay Jay Dixonbey	20	Detroit, Michigan	Jazz	Top 6
Darius Hickman	19	Green Acres, Florida	Contemporary	Top 6
Cole Mills	24	Ocean Township, New Jersey	Latin Ballroom	Top 8
Evan DeBenedetto	19	Ansonia, Connecticut	Tap	Top 10

=== Elimination chart ===
Contestants are listed in chronological order of elimination (TBD).

Legend
Female	Male	Bottom 4 contestants	Eliminated

Result show date:	8/13	8/20	8/27	9/10
Contestant	Results			
Hannahlei Cabanilla				Winner
Jensen Arnold				Runner-Up
Genessy Castillo		Btm 4		3rd Place
Slavik Pustovoytov				4th Place
Jay Jay Dixonbey			Elim	
Darius Hickman		Btm 4	Elim	
Cole Mills	Btm 4	Elim		
Magda Fialek	Btm 4	Elim		
Evan DeBenedetto	Elim			
Chelsea Hough	Elim			

=== Performances ===
==== Top 10 Perform, Part 1 (August 6, 2018) ====
- Group dance: Top 10: "Dream State" — Son Lux (Contemporary; Choreographer: Travis Wall)
- Judges: Nigel Lythgoe, Mary Murphy, Vanessa Hudgens, Stephen "tWitch" Boss

Couple	Style	Music	Choreographer(s)
Jensen Arnold; Jay Jay Dixonbey	Samba	"Mad Love" — Sean Paul & David Guetta feat. Becky G	Jean-Marc Généreux
Jensen Arnold; Jay Jay Dixonbey	Jazz	"Ex's & Oh's" — Elle King	Mandy Moore
Hannahlei Cabanilla; Cole Mills	Contemporary	"They Won't Go When I Go" — George Michael	Tyce Diorio
Hannahlei Cabanilla; Cole Mills	Paso Doble	"Heroes of Chaos" — Tybercore	Jean-Marc Généreux
Chelsea Hough; Evan DeBenedetto	Pop Jazz	"Make Me Feel (EDX Dubai Skyline Remix)" — Janelle Monáe	Ray Leeper
Chelsea Hough; Evan DeBenedetto	Tap	"Singin' In The Rain" — Jamie Cullum	Anthony Morigerato
Genessy Castillo; Slavik Pustovoytov	Hip-hop	"Round & Round" — Fabolous	Luther Brown
Genessy Castillo; Slavik Pustovoytov	Contemporary	"An Evening I Will Not Forget (Acoustic)" — Dermot Kennedy	Talia Favia
Magda Fialek; Darius Hickman	Contemporary	"Glass Heart Concerto" — Blondie & Philip Glass	Travis Wall
Magda Fialek; Darius Hickman	Cha-cha	"I Like It Like That" — Pete Rodriguez	Val Chmerkovskiy

==== Top 10 Perform, Part 2 (August 13, 2018) ====
- Group dance: Top 10: "Yummy" – Gwen Stefani ft. Pharrell Williams (Hip-hop; Choreographer: Luther Brown)
- Judges: Nigel Lythgoe, Mary Murphy, Vanessa Hudgens, Stephen "tWitch" Boss

Couple	Style	Music	Choreographer(s)	Result
Magda Fialek; Darius Hickman	Bollywood	"Badri Ki Dulhania"—Badrinath Ki Dulhania Soundtrack	Nakul Dev Mahajan	Fialek Bottom 4 Hickman Safe
Magda Fialek; Darius Hickman	Jazz	"Fever"—Peggy Lee	Mandy Moore	Fialek Bottom 4 Hickman Safe
Chelsea Hough; Evan DeBenedetto	Lyrical Hip-hop	"Love on the Brain"—Rihanna	Christopher Scott	Both Eliminated
Chelsea Hough; Evan DeBenedetto	Contemporary	"Snowing"—Sonya Kitchell	Travis Wall	Both Eliminated
Hannalei Cabanilla; Cole Mills	Hip-hop (Stepping)	"Pump It Up"—Joe Budden	Joe Brown	Cabanilla Safe; Mills Bottom 4
Hannalei Cabanilla; Cole Mills	Disco	"Last Dance"—Donna Summer	Doriana Sanchez	Cabanilla Safe; Mills Bottom 4
Jensen Arnold; Jay Jay Dixonbey	Contemporary	"Lost Without You"—Freya Ridings	Jaci Royal	Both Safe
Jensen Arnold; Jay Jay Dixonbey	African Jazz	"Run"—Hybrid Core Music + Sound	Sean Cheesman	Both Safe
Genessy Castillo; Slavik Pustovoytov	Jive	"Jump, Jive an' Wail"—The Brian Setzer Orchestra	Sharna Burgess	Both Safe
Genessy Castillo; Slavik Pustovoytov	Broadway	"Someone to Watch Over Me"—Ella Fitzgerald & London Symphony Orchestra	Al Blackstone	Both Safe

==== Top 8 Perform (August 20, 2018) ====
- Group dance:
  - Top 8: "Runaway" – Nathan Lanier (Hip-hop; Choreographer: Christopher Scott)
  - Top 4 Female Contestants: "Wanderlust" – Empara Mi (Contemporary; Choreographer: Talia Favia)
  - Top 4 Male Contestants: "Juice" – Yo Gotti (Hip-hop; Choreographer: Luther Brown)
- Judges: Nigel Lythgoe, Mary Murphy, Vanessa Hudgens, Stephen "tWitch" Boss

Couple	Style	Music	Choreographer(s)	Result
Jensen Arnold; Jay Jay Dixonbey	Jazz	"I Got You (I Feel Good)"—Jessie J	Sean Cheesman	Both Safe
Jensen Arnold; Jay Jay Dixonbey	Hip hop	"Cookin"—Fat Joe, Remy Ma & French Montana ft. RySoValid	Randi & Hef	Both Safe
Genessy Castillo; Slavik Pustovoytov	Contemporary	"Fall For You"—Leela James	Mandy Moore	Castillo Bottom 4 Putstovoytov Safe
Genessy Castillo; Slavik Pustovoytov	Jazz	"House Work"—Jax Jones ft. Mike Dunn & MNEK	Ray Leeper	Castillo Bottom 4 Putstovoytov Safe
Magda Fialek; Darius Hickman	Hip-hop	"Killa"—Disto	Pharside & Phoenix	Fialek Eliminated; Hickman Bottom 4
Magda Fialek; Darius Hickman	Contemporary	"Undertow"—Ane Brun	Jaci Royal	Fialek Eliminated; Hickman Bottom 4
Hannahlei Cabanilla; Cole Mills	Broadway	"Get Happy (Live)"—Judy Garland	Travis Wall	Cabanilla Safe; Mills Eliminated
Hannahlei Cabanilla; Cole Mills	Cha Cha	"Sing It Back"—Moloko	Sasha Farber & Emma Slater	Cabanilla Safe; Mills Eliminated

- Top 8 contestant's solos:

Contestant	Style	Music
Cole Mills	Jive	"Jailhouse Rock" – Elvis Presley
Hannahlei Cabanilla	Contemporary	"River (King Kavalier Remix)" – Bishop Briggs
Jay Jay Dixonbey	Jazz	"Clear Air" – Sevdaliza
Slavik Pustovoytov	Hip-hop	"Separate" – whereisalex
Magda Fialek	Samba	"Marchina (Samba/50 Bpm)" – TNN
Jensen Arnold	Cha Cha	"Ain't Your Mama" – Jennifer Lopez
Darius Hickman	Contemporary	"Strange Fruit" – Nina Simone
Genessy Castillo	Contemporary	"Yours" – Ella Henderson

==== Top 6 Perform (August 27, 2018) ====
- Group dance:
  - Top 6: "Spring 1" – Max Richter (Contemporary; Choreographer: Mia Michaels)
  - Top 3 Female Contestants: "Bump" – Trish (Hip-hop; Choreographer: Luther Brown)
  - Top 3 Male Contestants: "Violence Broken" – No Mono (Hip-hop; Choreographer: Christopher Scott)
- Judges: Nigel Lythgoe, Mary Murphy, Vanessa Hudgens, Stephen "tWitch" Boss

Couple	Style	Music	Choreographer(s)	Results
Jensen Arnold; Kiki Nyemchek	Cha cha cha	"Bailar (Radio Edit)" — Deorro ft. Elvis Crespo	Jenna Johnson (season 10)	Safe
Genessy Castillo; Lex Ishimoto	Jazz	"Be Brave" — My Brightest Diamond	Mandy Korpinen; Elizabeth Petrin	Safe
Slavik Pustovoytov; Jana "Jaja" Vaňková	Hip-hop	"Beggin' & Pleadin'" — Brandy	Comfort Fedoke (season 4)	Safe
Hannahlei Cabanilla; Marko Germar	Contemporary	"Welcome Home" — Joy Williams	Robert Roldan (season 7)	Safe
Jay Jay Dixonbey; Lauren Froderman	Jazz	"Runaway Baby" — Bruno Mars	Mandy Moore	Eliminated
Darius Hickman; Taylor Sieve	Contemporary	"It Takes A Lot to Know a Man" — Damien Rice	Travis Wall	Eliminated
Jensen Arnold; Jay Jay Dixonbey	Tahitian	"Lugahiva" — Te Vaka	Tiana Liufau	Arnold Safe; Dixonby Eliminated
Genessy Castillo; Slavik Pustovoytov	Salsa	"Machika" — J Balvin, Jeon & Anitta	Jonathan Platero; Oksana Platero	Both Safe
Hannahlei Cabanilla; Darius Hickman	Argentine Tango	"Tanguango" — Ryota Komatsu	Miriam Larici; Leonardo Barrionuevo	Cabanilla Safe; Hickman Eliminated

==== Top 4 Perform (September 3, 2018) ====
- Judges: Nigel Lythgoe, Mary Murphy, Vanessa Hudgens, Stephen "tWitch" Boss

Couple	Style	Music	Choreographer(s)	Results
Genessy Castillo; Slavik Pustovoytov	Hip-hop	"Poke It Out" — Playboi Carti & Nicki Minaj	Luther Brown	
Hannahlei Cabanilla; Jensen Arnold	Jazz (Heels)	"Dem Beats" — Todrick Hall ft. RuPaul	Brian Friedman	
Genessy Castillo; Jonathan Platero	Samba	"Watch Out For This (Bumaye)" — Major Lazer	Elena Samodanova	3rd Place
Slavik Pustovoytov; Melanie Moore	Contemporary	"Gun" — Mas Ysa	Travis Wall	4th Place
Hannahlei Cabanilla; Slavik Pustovoytov	African Jazz	"When Rivers Cry" — Somi ft. Common	Sean Cheesman	
Genessy Castillo; Jensen Arnold	Broadway	"Maybe This Time" — Liza Minnelli	Travis Wall	
Hannahlei Cabanilla; DuShaunt "Fik-shun" Stegall	Hip-hop	"Move Something" — DJ Quik & Problem	Randi & Hef	Winner
Jensen Arnold; Robert Roldan	Contemporary	"Can't Help Falling In Love" — Kina Grannis (from "Crazy Rich Asians")	Mandy Moore	Runner-Up
Genessy Castillo; Hannahlei Cabanilla	Contemporary	"Numbers" — Daughter	Talia Favia	
Jensen Arnold; Slavik Pustovoytov	Cha-Cha	"Boom" — Tiësto & Sevenn ft. Gucci Mane	Oksana Platero	

Top 4 contestant's solos:

Contestant	Style	Music
Genessy Castillo	Contemporary	"Cried" – Candice Glover
Slavik Pustovoytov	Hip-hop	"Some Minds" – Flume ft. Andrew Wyatt
Jensen Arnold	Cha Cha	"Where Have You Been" – Rihanna
Hannahlei Cabanilla	Contemporary	"Back Again" – Party Favor & Gent & Jawns

- all top 4 contestants were safe from elimination on September 3, winner was declared the following week on September 10, 2018.

== Ratings ==
=== U.S. Nielsen ratings ===
Show	Episode	First air date	Rating (18–49)	Share (18–49)	Viewers (millions)	Rank (timeslot)	Rank (night)
1	Auditions #1	June 4, 2018	0.7	3	3.25	3	3 (tied)
2	Auditions #2	June 11, 2018	0.7	3	2.96	3	3 (tied)
3	Auditions #3	June 18, 2018	0.8	4	3.17	2	3 (tied)
4	Auditions #4	June 25, 2018	0.6	3	2.85	2	4 (tied)
5	Academy #1	July 9, 2018	0.7	3	2.73	3	3 (tied)
6	Academy #2	July 16, 2018	0.6	3	2.42	3	5
7	Top Ten Women	July 23, 2018	0.6	3	2.60	3 (tied)	4 (tied)
8	Top Ten Men	July 31, 2018	0.6	3	2.61	3 (tied)	4 (tied)
9	Top 10 Perform, Part 1	August 6, 2018	0.6	3	2.49	3 (tied)	4 (tied)
10	Top 10 Perform, Part 2	August 13, 2018	0.6	3	2.59	4	5
11	Top 8 Perform	August 20, 2018	0.5	2	2.39	4	5 (tied)
12	Top 6 Perform	August 27, 2018	0.6	3	2.68	3	3 (tied)
13	Top 4 Perform	September 3, 2018	0.5	2	2.43	4	4 (tied)
14	Season Finale	September 10, 2018	0.6	3	2.60	4	5 (tied)
