= So You Think You Can Dance (American TV series) season 14 =

So You Think You Can Dance
- Season 14
- Hosted by: Cat Deeley
- Judges: Nigel Lythgoe; Mary Murphy; Vanessa Hudgens
- Winner: Lex Ishimoto
- Runner-up: Koine Iwasaki

Release
- Original network: Fox Broadcasting Company
- Original release: June 12 – September 25, 2017

Season chronology
- ← Previous; Season 13 Next → Season 15

So You Think You Can Dance, an American dance competition show, returned for its fourteenth season on Monday, June 12, 2017. The new season's judge panel once again features series creator Nigel Lythgoe (who also serves as executive producer), as well as the return of ballroom expert Mary Murphy, along with new permanent member Vanessa Hudgens joining the panel of judges, while Cat Deeley continues in her role as host for a thirteenth consecutive season.

== Auditions ==
Open auditions for season 14 were held in two cities beginning in March 2014.

Air Date	Audition Venue	City	Audition Date
June 26 & July 10, 2017	Gelsey Kirkland Academy of Classical Ballet	Brooklyn, NY	March 5 & 6, 2017
June 12 & 19, 2017	Orpheum Theater	Los Angeles, CA	March 17, 2017

=== All-stars ===
The season will consist of All-stars acting as judges for the Academy round who, after each individual dance style challenge, select contestants to join their team of four contestants. They will ultimately each choose one contestants at the end of Academy who will move on to compete in the live shows.

The All-stars are:

- Gaby Diaz - Season 12 - Winner
- Comfort Fedoke - Season 4 - Top 8
- Marko Germar - Season 8 - Top 3
- Jasmine Harper - Season 10 - Runner - Up
- Allison Holker - Season 2 - Top 8
- Jenna Johnson - Season 10 - Top 8
- Paul Karmiryan - Season 10 - Top 6
- Robert Roldan - Season 7 - Top 3
- Cyrus Spencer - Season 9 - Runner - Up
- Du-Shaunt "Fik-Shun" Stegall - Season 10 - Winner

== Studio Shows ==
=== Contestants ===
Contestants	Age	Home town	Dance style	All-star mentor	Placement
Lex Ishimoto	19	Irvine, California	Contemporary/Hip-Hop	Gaby Diaz	Winner
Koine Iwasaki	20	Pembroke Pines, Florida	Contemporary	Marko Germar	Runner-Up
Taylor Sieve	19	Maple Grove, Minnesota	Contemporary	Robert Roldan	Third
Chris "Kiki" Nyemchek	26	Teaneck, New Jersey	Latin Ballroom	Jenna Johnson	Fourth
Logan Hernandez	18	Miami, Florida	Contemporary	Allison Holker	Fifth/Sixth
Kaylee Millis	19	Kingston, Massachusetts	Contemporary/Hip-Hop	Cyrus Spencer	Fifth/Sixth
Mark Villaver	27	Honolulu, Hawaii	Breakdance	Comfort Fedoke	Seventh
Inyoung "Dassy" Lee	26	Seoul, South Korea	Popping	DuShuant "Fik-Shun" Stegall	Eighth
Sydney Tormey	19	Salem, Utah	Ballroom	Paul Karmiryan	Ninth
Robert Green	25	Raleigh, North Carolina	Hip-Hop	Jasmine Harper	Tenth

=== Elimination chart ===
Legend
Female	Male	Bottom 3 contestants	Eliminated

Result show date:	8/14	8/21	8/28	9/4	9/11	9/25
Contestant	Results					
Lex Ishimoto						Winner
Koine Iwasaki			Btm 3			Runner-Up
Taylor Sieve						3rd Place
Kiki Nyemchek				Btm 3		4th Place
Logan Hernandez	Btm 3				Elim	
Kaylee Millis			Btm 3	Btm 3	Elim	
Mark Villaver		Btm 3		Elim		
Inyoung "Dassy" Lee		Btm 3	Elim			
Sydney Tormey	Btm 3	Elim				
Robert Green	Elim					

=== Performances ===
==== Top 10 Perform, Part 1 (August 7, 2017) ====
Source, competing contestants' names:

- Judges: Nigel Lythgoe, Mary Murphy, Vanessa Hudgens

Contestants	Style	Music	Choreographer(s)	Result
All-stars	Contemporary	"Knocking On Heavens Door"—RAIGN	Mandy Moore	N/A
Dassy Lee; Du-Shaunt "Fik-Shun" Stegall	Popping	"Shake Your Pants"—Cameo	Popin' Pete	Safe
Logan Hernandez; Audrey Case*	Contemporary	"Protocol"—Leon Else	Tyce Diorio	Safe
Kiki Nyemchek; Jenna Johnson	Cha-cha	"There's Nothing Holdin' Me Back"—Shawn Mendes	Dmitry Chaplin	Safe
Kaylee Millis; Cyrus Spencer	Contemporary	"Clown"—Emeli Sandé	Tessandra Chavez	Safe
Lex Ishimoto; Gaby Diaz	Tap	"More"—Bobby Darin	Anthony Morigerato	Safe
Mark Villaver; Comfort Fedoke	Hip-hop	"REDMERCEDES"—Aminé	Luther Brown	Safe
Koine Iwasaki; Marko Germar	Contemporary	"Memories"—Alex Somers	Stacey Tookey	Safe
Sydney Tormey; Paul Karmiryan	Cha-cha	"All Stars"—Martin Solveig feat. Alma	Val Chmerkovskiy	Safe
Taylor Sieve; Robert Roldan	Contemporary	"Change Is Everything (A Capella Version)"—Son Lux	Travis Wall	Safe
Robert Green; Jasmine Harper	Hip-hop	"Perm"—Bruno Mars	Christopher Scott	Safe
Top 10 and all-stars	Group routine	"This Time"—Son Lux	Wade Robson; Amanda Robson; Tony Testa	N/A

* All-star Allison Holker injured her shoulder during rehearsal and couldn't perform on the show. Season 9 alumna Audrey Case danced in her place with Holker's pair Logan Hernandez.

==== Top 10 Perform, Part 2 (August 14, 2017) ====
- Group dance: Top 10 and all-stars: "You Should Be Dancing"—Bee Gees (Disco; Choreographers: Mandy Moore and Val Chmerkovskiy)
- Judges: Nigel Lythgoe, Mary Murphy, Vanessa Hudgens
- Guest dancer(s): Lethal Ladies of Baltimore Leadership School for Young Women feat. All-Stars (Stepping)

Contestants	Style	Music	Choreographer(s)	Result
Mark Villaver; Comfort Fedoke	Jazz	"Hater"—Various Production	Ray Leeper	Safe
Lex Ishimoto; Gaby Diaz	Argentine Tango	"Red & Black (Rojo y Negro)"—Ryōta Komatsu	Miriam Larici; Leonardo Barrionuevo	Safe
Kiki Nyemchek; Jenna Johnson	Hip-hop	"Caroline"—Aminé	Luther Brown	Safe
Sydney Tormey; Paul Karmiryan	Contemporary	"The Letting Go"—Melissa Etheridge	Jaci Royal	Bottom 2
Logan Hernandez; Allison Holker	Pop Jazz	"In the Morning"—Jaded	Brian Friedman	Bottom 3
Kaylee Millis; Cyrus Spencer	Hip-hop	"I'm Better"—Missy Elliott feat. Lamb	Christopher "Pharside" Jennings; Krystal "Phoenix" Meraz	Safe
Taylor Sieve; Robert Roldan	Broadway	"The Man That Got Away"—Judy Garland	Al Blackstone	Safe
Koine Iwasaki; Marko Germar	African Jazz	"Speaking in Tongues II"—Sheila Chandra	Sean Cheesman	Safe
~~Robert Green~~; Jasmine Harper	Contemporary	"Otherside"—Perfume Genius	Stacey Tookey	Eliminated
Inyoung "Dassy" Lee; DuShuant "Fik-Shun" Stegall	Bollywood	"Radha Nachegi"—Tevar Soundtrack	Nakul Dev Mahajan	Safe

- Top 10 contestant's solos:

Contestants	Style	Music
Koine Iwasaki	Contemporary	"Home"—Oliver Tank
Logan Hernandez	Contemporary	"The Radical Self"—AGF feat. Kubra Khademi
Taylor Sieve	Contemporary	"Tragedy (Austin Cello Version)"—Brandi Carlile
Kaylee Millis	Contemporary/Hip-hop	"Dragon"—LVNDVN
Robert Green	Hip-hop	"Look At Me Now"—Chris Brown feat. Busta Rhymes and Lil Wayne
Inyoung "Dassy" Lee	Popping	"Battling Go-Go Yubari in Downtown L.A."—edIT
Lex Ishimoto	Contemporary/Hip-hop	"Rollin" by Shakka ft. Frisco
Sydney Tormey	Cha Cha	"Swish Swish"—Katy Perry feat. Nicki Minaj
Mark Villaver	Breakdance	"Is It a Crime"—Sade
Kiki Nyemchek	Samba	"The Drummer"—Alessandro Olivato Orchestra

==== Top 9 Perform (August 21, 2017) ====
- Group dance:
  - Top 9 and all-stars: "Ya Yar"—Jonte' (Hip-hop; Choreographer: Luther Brown)
  - All-stars: "Strange Fruit"—Nina Simone (Contemporary; Choreographer: Travis Wall)
  - Top 9: "Hey Pachuco!"—Royal Crown Revue (Jazz/Broadway; Choreographer: Chris Baldock)
- Judges: Nigel Lythgoe, Mary Murphy, Vanessa Hudgens

Contestants	Style	Music	Choreographer(s)	Result
Logan Hernandez; Allison Holker	Jive	"Five Months, Two Weeks, Two Days"—Louis Prima	Emma Slater; Sasha Farber	Safe
Koine Iwasaki; Marko Germar	Lyrical Hip-hop	"You Don't Own Me"—Grace feat. G-Eazy	Dave Scott	Safe
Inyoung "Dassy" Lee; DuShaunt "Fik-Shun" Stegall	Jazz	"Bring the Funk Back"—Big Gigantic	Ray Leeper	Bottom 2
Mark Villaver; Comfort Fedoke	Contemporary	"Ending"—Isak Danielson	Talia Favia	Bottom 3
Lex Ishimoto; Gaby Diaz	Broadway	"Miss Otis Regrets"—Bette Midler	Warren Carlyle	Safe
Kaylee Millis; Cyrus Spencer	Jazz	"Less Talk, More Art"—Vito Fun & Koil	Spencer Liff	Safe
~~Sydney Tormey~~; Paul Karmiryan	Hip-hop	"Really? Yeah!"—KYLE	Luther Brown	Eliminated
Taylor Sieve; Robert Roldan	Samba	"Bun Up the Dance"—Dillon Francis & Skrillex	Jean-Marc Généreux	Safe
Kiki Nyemchek; Jenna Johnson	Contemporary	"The First Time Ever I Saw Your Face"—George Michael	Mandy Moore	Safe

- Top 9 contestant's solos:

Contestant	Style	Music
Kaylee Millis	Contemporary/Hip-hop	"Wait for You"—Elliott Yamin
Sydney Tormey	Cha Cha	"Bla Bla Bla Cha Cha Cha"—Petty Booka
Kiki Nyemchek	Cha Cha	"Love Potion #9"—The Coasters
Taylor Sieve	Jazz	"Escalate"—Tsar B
Logan Hernandez	Contemporary	"Otherside"—Perfume Genius
Koine Iwasaki	Contemporary	"Confidently Lost"—Sabrina Claudio
Mark Villaver	Breakdance	"I See Fire"—Ed Sheeran
Inyoung "Dassy" Lee	Popping	"Soundclash"—Flosstradamus & TroyBoi
Lex Ishimoto	Contemporary/Hip-hop	"TRNSTTR (Lucian Remix)"—Black Coast featuring M. Maggie

==== Top 8 Perform (August 28, 2017) ====
- Group dance:
  - Top 8 and all-stars: "Call Me Mother"—RuPaul (Jazz/Vogue; Choreographer: Mark Kanemura)
  - All-Stars: "Truth"—Balmorea (Contemporary; Choreographer: Jaci Royal)
- Judges: Nigel Lythgoe, Mary Murphy, Vanessa Hudgens

Contestants	Style	Music	Choreographer(s)	Result
Koine Iwasaki; Marko Germar	Jazz	"HandClap"—Fitz and the Tantrums	Mandy Moore	Bottom 3
Taylor Sieve; Robert Roldan	Hip-hop	"Bodak Yellow"—Cardi B	Luther Brown	Safe
Lex Ishimoto; Gaby Diaz	Contemporary	"Work Song"—Luke Wade	Mandy Moore	Safe
Kaylee Millis; Cyrus Spencer	Cha-Cha	"Respect"—Aretha Franklin	Val Chmerkovskiy	Bottom 2
Mark Villaver; Comfort Fedoke	Broadway	"Criminal"—Postmodern Jukebox feat. Ariana Savalas	Spencer Liff	Safe
Kiki Nyemchek; Jenna Johnson	Jazz	"Pop Hd"—AtomTM	Travis Wall	Safe
~~Inyoung "Dassy" Lee~~; DuShaunt "Fik-Shun" Stegall	Contemporary	"Breathe"—Son Lux	Jaci Royal	Eliminated
Logan Hernandez; Allison Holker	Lyrical Hip-hop	"Say You Won't Let Go"—Boyce Avenue	Christopher Scott	Safe
Taylor Sieve; Lex Ishimoto	Jazz	"An American In Paris"—James Levine & Chicago Symphony Orchestra	Spencer Liff	Both Safe
Koine Iwasaki; Kiki Nyemchek	Salsa	"Danca Molengo"—Bonde do Rolê feat. Rizzle Kicks	Val Chmerkovskiy	Iwasaki Bottom 3
Kaylee Millis; Logan Hernandez	Contemporary	"Shadows"—Woodkid	Travis Wall	Millis Bottom 3
~~Inyoung "Dassy" Lee~~; Mark Villaver	Hip-hop	"Tilted"—Christine and The Queens	Christopher Scott	Lee Eliminated

==== Top 7 Perform: Quarter-Finals (September 4, 2017) ====
- Group dance:
  - Top 7 and all-stars: "Overture" — Merrily We Roll Along (2012 New York Cast) (Broadway; Choreographer: Warren Carlyle)
  - All-Stars: "Derniére Danse" — Indila (Jazz; Choreographer: Brian Friedman)
- Judges: Nigel Lythgoe, Mary Murphy, Vanessa Hudgens

Contestants	Style	Music	Choreographer(s)	Result
Lex Ishimoto; Gaby Diaz	Hip-hop	"Humble." - Kendrick Lamar	Luther Brown	Safe
Logan Hernandez; Allison Holker	African Jazz	"Kabila" - Lord KraVen	Sean Cheesman	Safe
Kaylee Millis; Cyrus Spencer	Contemporary	"DKLA" - Troye Sivan ft. Tkay Maidza	Tyce Diorio	Bottom 2
Kiki Nyemchek; Jenna Johnson	Broadway	"Dancin' Fool" - Barry Manilow	Warren Carlyle	Bottom 3
Koine Iwasaki; Marko Germar	Jive	"Rock Around The Clock" - Bill Haley & His Comets	Dmitry Chaplin	Safe
Taylor Sieve; Robert Roldan	Contemporary	"To Make You Feel My Love" - Mick McAuley & Winifred Horan	Mandy Moore	Safe
~~Mark Villaver~~; Comfort Fedoke	Hip-hop	"No Twerk" - Apashe & Panther x Odalis	Misha Gabriel	Eliminated
Kaylee Millis; Lex Ishimoto; Logan Hernandez	Contemporary	"Strange" - LP	Dwight Rhoden and Desmond Richardson	N/A
Kiki Nyemchek; Koine Iwasaki; ~~Mark Villaver~~; Taylor Sieve	Contemporary	"Still I Rise (Maya Angelou)" - Alexis Henry	Sean Cheesman	N/A

- Top 7 contestant's solos:

Contestant	Style	Music
Taylor Sieve	Contemporary	"Open Hands" - Ingrid Michaelson feat. Trent Dabbs
Mark Villaver	Breakdance	"Funkytown" - Lipps, Inc.
Koine Iwasaki	Contemporary	"I Fall Apart" - Post Malone
Logan Hernandez	Contemporary/Breakdance	"Intro" - M83
Lex Ishimoto	Hip-hop	"Sleep Talk" - Skye Chai
Kaylee Millis	Jazz/Hip-hop	"Bad Blood" - NAO
Kiki Nyemchek	Jive	"Land of 1000 Dances" - Wilson Pickett

==== Top 6 Perform: Semi-Finals (September 11, 2017) ====
- Group dance:
  - Top 6 and all-stars: "Prism" - Nathan Lanier (Hip-hop; Choreographer: Christopher Scott)
  - All-Stars: "Floreana" - Baauer (Contemporary; Choreographer: Andrew Winghart)
- Judges: Nigel Lythgoe, Mary Murphy, Vanessa Hudgens

Contestants	Style	Music	Choreographer(s)	Result
Lex Ishimoto; Gaby Diaz	Samba	"Chillando Goma" - Fulanito	Sasha Farber	Safe
Koine Iwasaki; Marko Germar	Contemporary	"You're the Last Thing On My Mind" - Aron Wright	Mandy Korpinen; Elizabeth Petrin	Safe
Kiki Nyemchek; Jenna Johnson	Jazz	"Proud Mary" - Tina Turner	Ray Leeper	Safe
~~Kaylee Millis~~; Cyrus Spencer	Hip-hop	"Die Trying" - Michl	Phillip "Pacman" Chbeeb (season 5)	Eliminated
Taylor Sieve; Robert Roldan	Urban	"Numb & Getting Colder" - Flume feat. Kucka	Keone & Mari Madrid	Safe
~~Logan Hernandez~~; Allison Holker	Contemporary	"The Other Side" - Ruelle	Dee Caspary	Eliminated
Koine Iwasaki; Lex Ishimoto	Disco	"Knock on Wood" - Amii Stewart	Doriana Sanchez	Both safe
Taylor Sieve; ~~Logan Hernandez~~	Jazz	"Gypsy" - Lady Gaga	Mark Kanemura (season 4)	Hernandez Eliminated
~~Kaylee Millis~~; Kiki Nyemchek	Bollywood	"Gallan Goodiyan" from Dil Dhadakne Do	Nakul Dev Mahajan	Millis Eliminated

- Top 6 contestant's solos:

Contestant	Style	Music
Kaylee Millis	Hip-hop	"LOVE." - Kendrick Lamar feat. Zacari
Taylor Sieve	Contemporary	"Unravel Me" - Sabrina Claudio
Logan Hernandez	Contemporary	"Infinity Street" - Richard Walters
Koine Iwasaki	Contemporary	"Why I Love You" - MAJOR.
Lex Ishimoto	Contemporary/Hip-hop	"Brother" - Matt Corby
Kiki Nyemchek	Samba	"Summertime" - Billy Stewart

==== Top 4 Perform: Finale (September 18, 2017) ====
- Group dance:
  - Top 4 and all-stars: "Mi Gente" — J Balvin & Willie William (Hip-hop; Choreographer: Napoleon & Tabitha D'Umo)
  - Top 4: "Elements"— Nathan Lanier (Contemporary; Choreographer: Travis Wall & Christopher Scott)
  - All-Stars: "DNA."—Kendrick Lamar (Hip-hop; Choreographer: Keone & Mari Madrid)
- Judges: Nigel Lythgoe, Mary Murphy, Vanessa Hudgens

Contestants	Style	Music	Choreographer(s)
Taylor Sieve; Kiki Nyemchek	Cha-cha	"Don't Cha (Ralphi's Hot Freak 12" Vox Mix)" — The Pussycat Dolls	Anya Garnis
Kiki Nyemchek; Jenna Johnson	Contemporary	"The First Time Ever I Saw Your Face"—Jeffrey Gaines	Mandy Moore
Koine Iwasaki; Lex Ishimoto	Broadway	"L-O-V-E" — Nat King Cole	Al Blackstone
Koine Iwasaki; Marko Germar	African Jazz	"Speaking in Tongues II"—Sheila Chandra	Sean Cheesman
Koine Iwasaki; Taylor Sieve	Jazz	"Black & Gold" — Brenna Whitaker	Mandy Moore
Kiki Nyemchek; Lex Ishimoto	Hip-hop	"The Rain (Supa Dupa Fly)" — Missy Elliott	Luther Brown
Lex Ishimoto; Gaby Diaz	Tap	"More" — Bobby Darin	Anthony Morigerato
Taylor Sieve; Robert Roldan	Contemporary	"Change Is Everything (A Cappella Version)" - Son Lux	Travis Wall
Kiki Nyemchek; Koine Iwasaki	Contemporary	"Both Sides Now" — Joni Mitchell	Travis Wall
Lex Ishimoto; Taylor Sieve	Contemporary	"You Matter To Me" by Sara Bareilles ft. Jason Mraz	Mia Michaels

- Top 4 contestant's solos:

Contestant	Style	Music
Lex Ishimoto	Contemporary/Hip-hop	"The Melody" - Eskmo
Kiki Nyemchek	Paso Doble	"He's A Pirate" (Ship Ahoy Tribal Remix) - Chris Joss & Klaus Badelt
Koine Iwasaki	Contemporary	"The Truth" - Audiomachine
Taylor Sieve	Contemporary	"Water Me" - FKA twigs

== Ratings ==
=== U.S. Nielsen ratings ===
Show	Episode	First air date	Rating (18–49)	Share (18–49)	Viewers (millions)	Rank (timeslot)	Rank (night)
1	Auditions #1	June 12, 2017	0.9	4	3.56	3	5 (tie)
2	Auditions #2	June 19, 2017	0.9	4	3.40	3	4
3	Auditions #3	June 26, 2017	0.8	3	3.10	3	5
4	Auditions #4	July 10, 2017	0.8	4	2.94	3	4
5	Academy #1	July 17, 2017	0.7	3	2.82	3	4
6	Academy #2	July 24, 2017	0.7	3	2.75	3	4
7	Academy #3	July 31, 2017	0.7	3	2.63	3	4 (tie)
8	Top 10 Perform, Part 1	August 7, 2017	0.7	3	2.57	3 (tie)	4 (tie)
9	Top 10 Perform, Part 2	August 14, 2017	0.7	3	2.81	3 (tie)	3 (tie)
10	Top 9 Perform	August 21, 2017	0.7	3	2.74	3 (tie)	3 (tie)
11	Top 8 Perform	August 28, 2017	0.8	3	2.95	3	4
12	Top 7 Perform	September 4, 2017	0.6	3	2.55	4	7 (tie)
13	Top 6 Perform	September 11, 2017	0.6	2	2.48	4	5 (tie)
14	Top 4 Perform	September 18, 2017	0.6	2	2.14	4	8 (tie)
15	Season Finale	September 25, 2017	0.5	2	1.91	4	10
