= Ezra Sosa =

American professional dancer (born 2000)

- Born: Ezra Jochen Sosa; November 15, 2000 (age 26); Provo, Utah, U.S.
- Occupations: Dancer; choreographer
- Years active: 2013–present
- Television: Dancing with the Stars

Ezra Jochen Sosa (born November 15, 2000) is an American professional Latin and ballroom dancer best known for his appearances on the reality competition series Dancing with the Stars.

== Early life ==
Ezra Sosa was born on November 15, 2000, and is from Provo, Utah. His father, Enrique Sosa, emigrated to the United States from Argentina, and his mother, Lucrecia Sosa, emigrated from Mexico. He has an older sister, Stephani Sosa, and an older brother, Tristen Sosa, both of whom are also professional dancers.

== Personal life ==
Sosa is openly gay.

== So You Think You Can Dance ==
In 2019, he competed on season 16 of So You Think You Can Dance. He made it to the top 6 before being eliminated.

== Dancing with the Stars ==
Sosa joined Dancing with the Stars for season 30 in September 2021. Both he and Sofia Ghavami were announced as professional dancers who would perform in couples’ dances throughout the season and be prepped to step in if another pro dancer was unable to compete. For season 31, Sosa was a part of the dance troupe alongside new pros Kateryna Klishyna, Alexis Warr, and D'Angelo Castro. In season 32, he returned to the role he had in season 30 where he filled in if another pro dancer could not compete. During week 2 of competition, he was partnered with Charity Lawson after her partner, Artem Chigvintsev, tested positive for COVID-19. They danced a cha-cha-cha to "She Bangs" by Ricky Martin, and received three sevens from the judges for a score of 21.

For season 33, Sosa was promoted to pro. He was partnered with con artist Anna Delvey. They were eliminated week 2.

For season 34, Sosa was paired with Olympic artistic gymnast Jordan Chiles. They made it to the finale and finished in third place.

For season 35, Sosa was paired with actress & director Julia Stiles. They were eliminated week 8.

Season	Partner	Place
33	Anna Delvey	12th
34	Jordan Chiles	3rd
35	Julia Stiles	8th

=== Season 33 ===
Celebrity partner: Anna Delvey

Week	Dance	Music	Judges' scores (Note: Individual judges' scores are listed in the following order: Carrie Ann Inaba, Derek Hough, Bruno Tonioli.)			Total score	Result
1	Cha-cha-cha	"Espresso" — Sabrina Carpenter	6	6	6	18	No elimination
2	Quickstep	"Suddenly I See" — KT Tunstall	6	5	6	17	Eliminated

=== Season 34 ===
Celebrity partner: Jordan Chiles

Week	Dance	Music	Judges' scores			Total score	Result
1	Salsa	"Break My Soul" — Beyoncé	—N/a	5	5	10 (Note: The couples were scored on a 20-point scale due to Carrie Ann Inaba's absence.)	No elimination
2	Jive	"Maniac" — Michael Sembello	8	7	7	22	Safe
3	Tango	"Anxiety" — Doechii	8	8	8	24	Safe
4	Quickstep	"Special Spice" — PJ Morton	8	8	8	24	Safe
5	Viennese Waltz	"Daughters" — John Mayer	8	8	8	32 (Note: Jordan and Ezra also received a score of 8 from guest judge Kym Johnson.)	No elimination
6	Rumba	"For Good" — Cynthia Erivo & Ariana Grande	10	9	10	39 (Note: Jordan and Ezra also received a score of 10 from guest judge Jon M. Chu.)	Safe
7	Contemporary	"Elastic Heart" — Sia	9	8	9	34 (Note: Jordan and Ezra also received a score of 8 from guest judge Cheryl Burke.)	Safe
7	Hustle & Lindy Hop; Marathon	"Murder on the Dancefloor" — Sophie Ellis-Bextor & "A Little Party Never Killed Nobody (All We Got)" — Fergie, Q-Tip, & GoonRock	+4			4 (Note: Jordan and Ezra received 4 extra points in the dance marathon.)	Safe
8	Jazz	"River Deep – Mountain High" — Ike & Tina Turner	10	9	9	38 (Note: Jordan and Ezra also received a score of 10 from guest judge Flavor Flav.)	Safe
8	Team Freestyle	"25 or 6 to 4" — Chicago	10	10	10	40 (Note: Team Chicago also received a score of 10 from guest judge Flavor Flav.)	Safe
9	Cha-cha-cha	"Get Up" — Ciara, feat. Chamillionaire	9	10	9	37 (Note: Jordan and Ezra also received a score of 9 from guest judge Tom Bergeron.)	Safe
9	Quickstep (Note: Jordan performed the relay with Apolo Anton Ohno.)	"I Get a Kick Out of You" — Michael Bublé	Winner			2 (Note: Jordan and Ezra received 2 extra points for winning the relay round with Apolo.)	Safe
10	Jive	"Raspberry Beret" — Prince	9	9	9	27	Safe
10	Argentine tango	"U Got the Look" — Prince	10	10	10	30	Safe
11	Paso doble	"Breakin' Dishes" — Rihanna	9	10	10	29	Third place
11	Tango	"I Like It" — Alesso & Nate Smith	10	10	10	30	Third place
11	Freestyle	"Bow Down (Homecoming Live)" — Beyoncé & "Motivation" — Normani	10	10	10	30	Third place

=== Season 35 ===
Celebrity partner: Julia Stiles

Week	Dance	Music	Judges' scores			Total score	Result
1	Quickstep	"9 to 5" — Dolly Parton	6	6	6	18	Safe
2	Tango	"The Door" — Teddy Swims	5	6	5	16	Safe
3	Salsa	"I Can't Go for That (No Can Do)" — Hall & Oates	6	7	6	19	Safe
4	Viennese Waltz	"Vision of Love" — Mariah Carey	7	7	7	21	Safe
5	Jazz	"Jenny from the Block (Trackmasters Remix)" — Jennifer Lopez feat. Jadakiss & Styles P	8	8	9	33 (Note: Julia and Ezra also received a score of 8 from guest judge Joe Buck.)	Safe
6	Contemporary	"Can't Take My Eyes Off You" — Frankie Valli	9	9	9	36 (Note: Julia and Ezra also received a score of 9 from guest judge Kym Johnson.)	No elimination
7	Argentine tango	"The Dogs Attack" — Jerry Goldsmith	7	7	8	26 (Note: Julia and Ezra also received a score of 4 from guest judge Shirley Ballas.)	Safe
8	Paso doble	"Satisfied" — Hamilton	8	8	8	33 (Note: Jordan and Ezra also received a score of 9 from guest judge Cynthia Erivo.)	Eliminated
8	Team Freestyle	"Zoo" — Zootopia 2	9	9	9	36 (Note: Team Slaytopia also received a score of 9 from guest judge Cynthia Erivo.)	Eliminated

== Filmography ==
Year	Title	Role	Notes
2019	So You Think You Can Dance	Himself	Contestant; season 16
2021–present	Dancing with the Stars	Himself	Professional dancer
2021	High School Musical: The Musical: The Series	Klaus	3 episodes
2021	The Bitch Who Stole Christmas	Dancing Husband #6	
2022	RuPaul's Drag Race All Stars	Himself	Dancer; Season 7 - Episode 9: "Dance Like a Drag Queen"
2024	A Capitol Fourth	Himself	Television Special
2025	The Secret Lives of Mormon Wives	Himself	Season 3 - Episode 8: "The Book of Awakening"
2026	Project Runway	Himself	Season 22 - Episode 8: "Designing with the Stars"

== Awards and nominations ==
Year	Award	Category	Work	Results	Ref.
2026	Queerty Awards	Reality TV Star	Himself	Won	

== Notes ==
Awards and achievements
Preceded by Chandler Kinney & Brandon Armstrong	Dancing with the Stars (US) third place contestant Season 34 (Fall 2025 with Jordan Chiles)	Succeeded by
