= Summit High School (Colorado) =

Location
- 16201 Highway 9 Breckenridge, Colorado 80443; United States; 39°33′56″N 106°03′22″W

Information
- School district: Summit School District
- CEEB code: 060135
- Principal: Britney Acres & Douglas Blake
- Staff: 69.11 (FTE)
- Age: 14 to 18
- Enrollment: 1,123 (2023–2024)
  - Grade 9: 266
  - Grade 10: 294
  - Grade 11: 266
  - Grade 12: 297
- Student to teacher ratio: 16.25
- Colors: Green, White, Yellow
- Mascot: Tigers
- Nickname: Summit
- Rival: Battle Mountain High School
- Newspaper: Tiger Times
- Website: shs.summitk12.org

Summit High School is a high school serving Summit County in the central Rocky Mountains of Colorado, United States. About 1,500 students attend the school from the surrounding mountain towns of Frisco, Dillon, Silverthorne, Breckenridge, Copper Mountain, Keystone and Summit Cove. Summit Middle School, located in Frisco, is the only feeder school for Summit High School.

The high school is located 75 miles west of Denver, between Breckenridge and Frisco, near the Farmer's Korner housing subdivision. It sits at an elevation of 9,050' (2,758m).

Timothy Ridder serves as the school's principal and Brittny Acres as the assistant principal.

Summit High offers AP, IB, DP, and college-level courses through Colorado Mountain College.

The high school has a variety of sports offered not limited to but including: rugby, lacrosse, football, basketball, swimming, wrestling and track and field.

== Notable alumni ==
- Mandy Moore, choreographer
- Al Jourgensen, musician
