= Nakul Dev Mahajan =

American dancer and choreographer

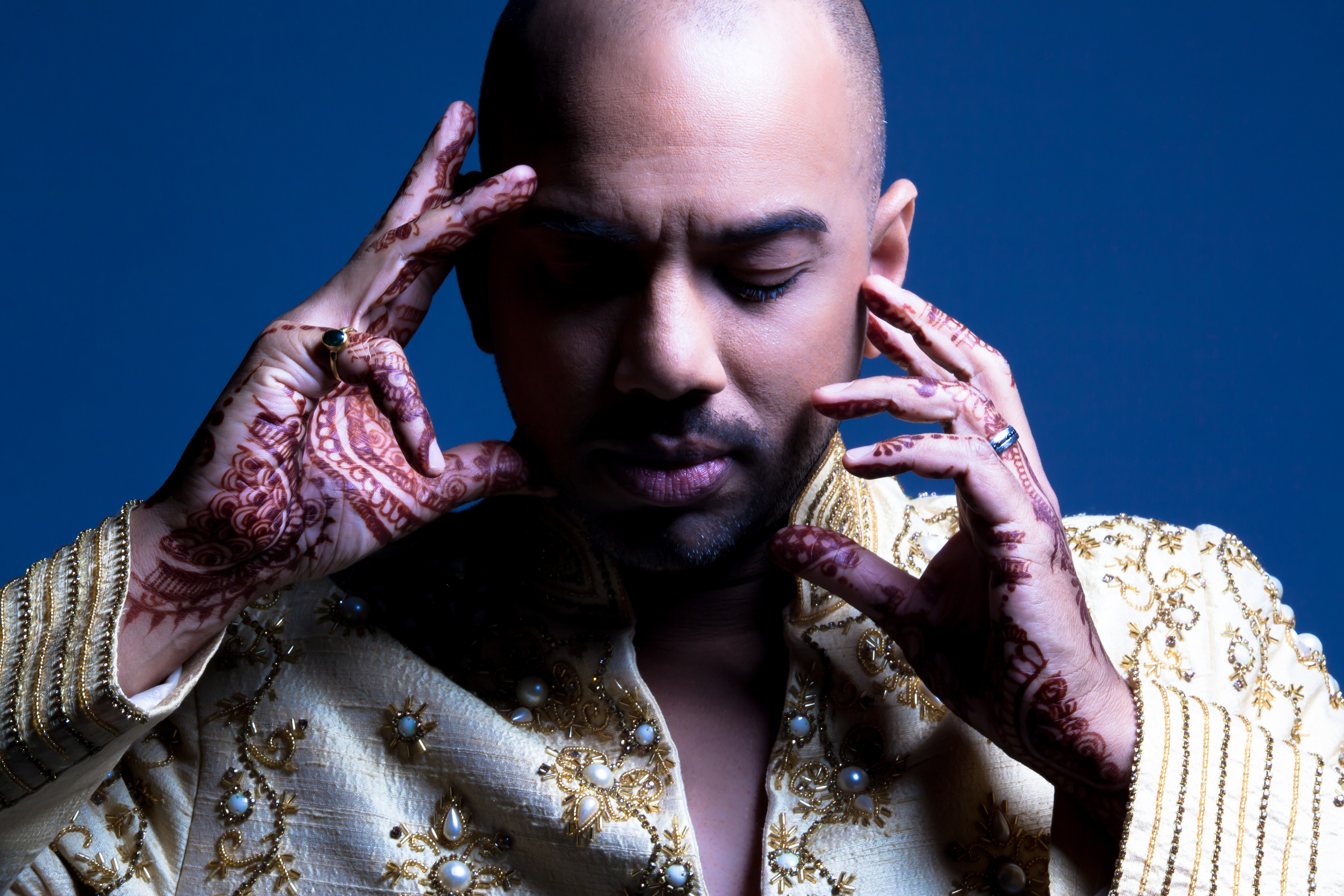
- Born: September 15, 1975 (age 51); Agra, Uttar Pradesh, India
- Occupations: Dancer, choreographer
- Years active: 2003 - present
- Dancing career
- Current group: NDM Bollywood Dance Productions and Studios
- Dances: Bollywood dance
- Website: www.ndmdance.com

Nakul Dev Mahajan (born 15 September 1975) is an Indian-American Bollywood dancer and choreographer best known for his choreography on So You Think You Can Dance. He is the founder and artistic director of NDM Bollywood Dance Productions and Studios, a Bollywood dance company based in Artesia, California. Mahajan has served as a talent show judge for reality television productions. His dance choreography is prominent in the Disney Junior animated series Mira, Royal Detective.

== Early life and background ==
Born in Agra, India, in a Punjabi family, Mahajan and his family immigrated to the United States in the 1960s. Mahajan began formal dance training at age 17, and graduated from the University of California, Riverside with a bachelor's degree in Sociology and Dance in 2002.

== Career ==
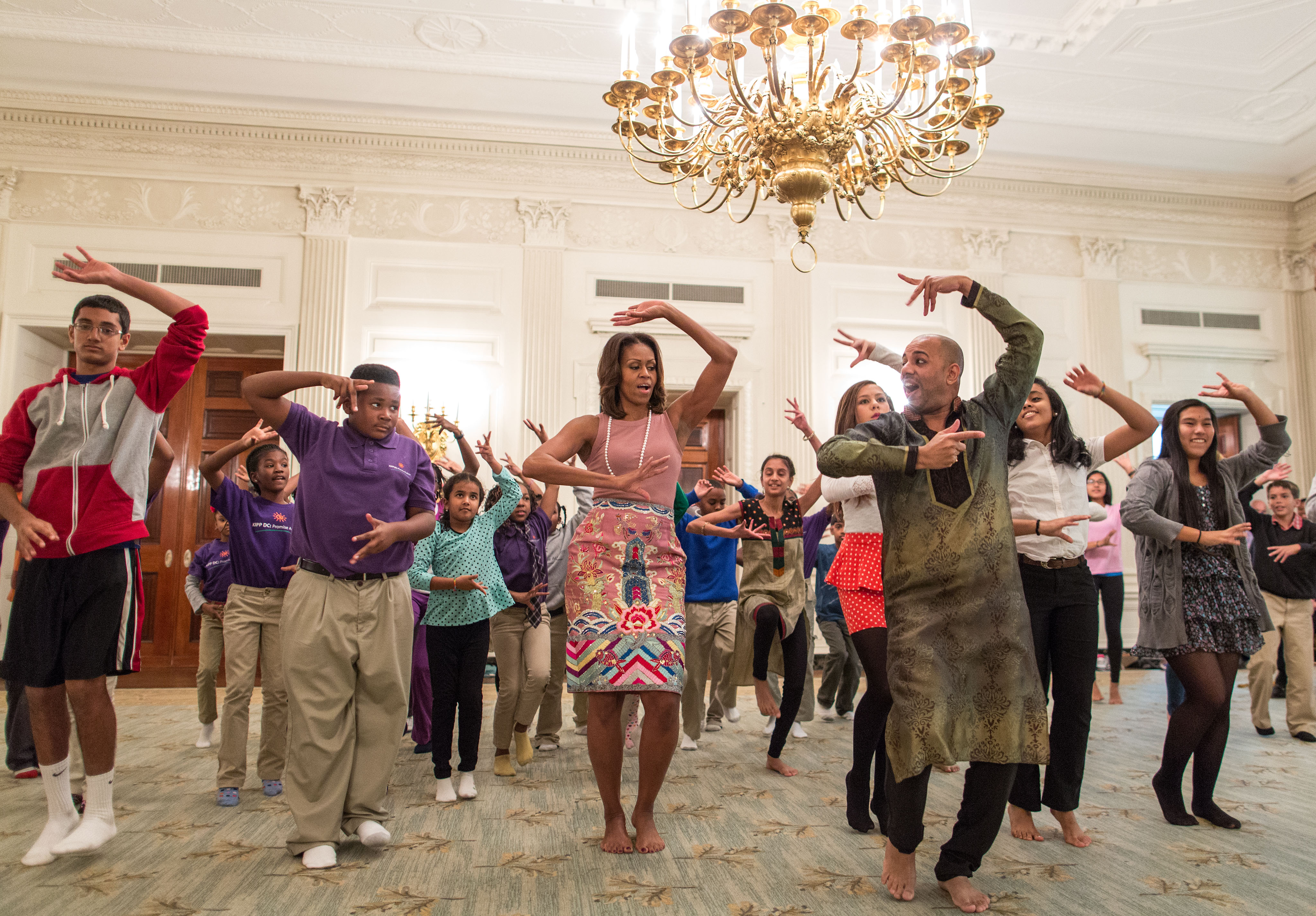
Michelle Obama joins students for a Bollywood Dance Clinic with Nakul Dev Mahajan, in White House, November 5, 2013

The work of Nakul Dev Mahajan has been influenced by classical indian dances and Western dance styles (hip-hop, Latin and jazz). As a result of his efforts to teach and promote the Bollywood dance style, Mahajan has been called Hollywood’s Favorite Bollywood Choreographer and an Ambassador of Bollywood Dance.

Mahajan appeared as a guest star (dancer) in season 3, episode 6 (Diwali) of The Office (TV sitcom), led a Bollywood Dance instructional session prior to the 81st Academy Awards (2009), and choreographed a flash mob style Bollywood scene for an episode of Fuller House (TV series) (2016). Sonia Singh and Mahajan co-authored the script for One Man Bollywood Show, a 2009 stage production performed by Mahajan.

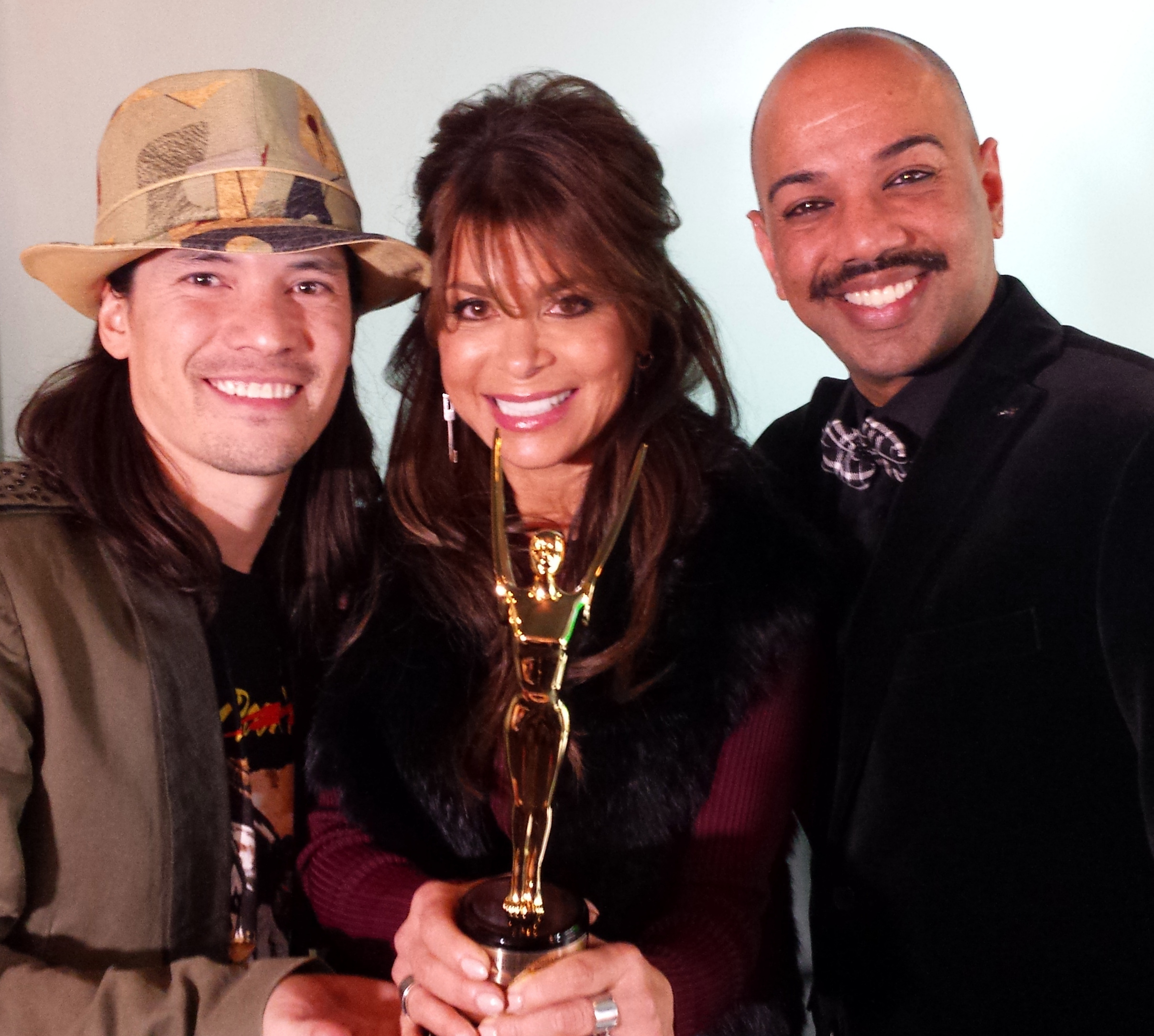
2015 World Choreography Award recipients (left to right) Chucky Klapow, Paula Abdul, Nakul Dev Mahajan, Renee Ritchie (not pictured), for the video 'Check Yourself'.

In 2011, Mahajan was the recipient of the University of California, Riverside Outstanding Young Alumnus Award. Mahajan was selected to the "Wall of the World" panel of judges for CBS' The World's Best (reality talent competition).

In 2015, the World Choreography Award (Digital Media Format) was awarded for Check Yourself, a collaboration between Mahajan, Chucky Klapow, Paula Abdul, and Renee Ritchie.

=== Dance Studios ===
In 2003, Mahajan founded NDM Bollywood Dance Productions and Studios, the first Bollywood dance school in the U.S.; the school has since served over 3000 students.

In 2015, 430 students and 20 members of the school's dance troupe performed Bollywood Travels (the annual student recital) for a total of 2700 audience members. Mahajan serves as a guest instructor in the faculty of the Broadway Dance Center.

In 2026, Mahajan's production "The Little Mermaid" was a sold out show.

=== Television ===
==== So You Think You Can Dance (U.S., 2008-2019) ====
Nakul Dev Mahajan's choreography introduced the Bollywood Dance style to the stage of So You Think You Can Dance (reality TV show) in Season 4. Katee Shean and Joshua Allen's performance of Mahajan's routine for Season 4 was in YouTube's "Most Viewed" list for one week, and was included in BuzzFeed's 2014 25 Best 'So You Think You Can Dance' Routines of all Time listing. In subsequent seasons of the show, Bollywood performances were included regularly (see summary table, below).

==== Choreography for So You Think You Can Dance (U.S.) ====
Season	Week	Dancers	Style	Song	Result	Reference
4	5	Katee Shean; Joshua Allen	Bollywood	"Dhoom Taana" from Om Shanti Om	Safe	
4	6	Top 10	Bollywood	"JBJ" from Jhoom Barabar Jhoom		
4	9	Katee Shean; Joshua Allen	Bollywood	"Dhoom Taana" from Om Shanti Om	Judge's Pick (Nigel Lythgoe)	
5	1	Caitlin Kinney; Jason Glover	Bollywood	"Jai Ho" from Slumdog Millionaire	Safe	
5	6	Top 5 Female Dancers	Bollywood	"Dholna" from Pyaar Ke Geet		
5	9	Caitlin Kinney; Jason Glover	Bollywood	"Jai Ho" from Slumdog Millionaire	Judge's Pick (Christopher Lil' C Toler)	
6 (2009)	2	Mollee Gray; Nathan Trasoras	Bollywood	"Azeem O Shaan Shahenshah" from Jodhaa Akbar	Safe	
6 (2009)	4	Guest dancers, Nakul Dev Mahajan and NDM Bollywood Dance Productions	Bollywood	"Desi Girl" from Dostana	N/A	
6 (2009)	7	Russell Ferguson; Ashleigh Di Lello (injured, replaced by Rachel ___)	Bollywood	"Spirit of Rangeela" from Rangeela	Safe	
6 (2009)	8	Mollee Gray; Nathan Trasoras	Bollywood	"Azeem O Shaan Shahenshah" from Jodhaa Akbar	Judge's Pick (Tyce Diorio)	
7 (2010)	2	Kathryn McCormick; Jose Ruiz	Bollywood	Marjaani Marjaani Kasama from Billu	Safe	
7 (2010)	4	AdéChiké Torbert; Marla ____ (substitution for Alex Wong)	Bollywood	Mourya Re from Don: The Chase Begins Again	Alex Wong injured (withdrew)	
7 (2010)	7	Billy Bell; Robert Roldan	Bollywood	Ganesh from Bombay Dreams	Judge's Pick (Stacey Tookey); Bell Eliminated	
7 (2010)	9	Kent Boyd; Lauren Gottlieb	Bollywood	Om Mangalam from Kambakkht Ishq		
8 (2011)	2	Iveta Lukosiute; Nick Young	Bollywood	Baawre from Luck by Chance	Eliminated	
8 (2011)	4	Group dance	Bollywood	Kata Kata from Raavan		
8 (2011)	6	Clarice Ordaz; Robert Roldan	Bollywood	Aila Re Aila from Khatta Meetha	Eliminated	
9 (2012)	2	Witney Carson; Chehon Wespi-Tschopp	Bollywood	"Tandav Music" from Aatish Kapadi	Eliminated	
9 (2012)	5	Kathryn McCormick; Will Thomas	Bollywood	Ooh La La from The Dirty Picture	Safe	
10 (2013)	2	Malece Miller; Jade Zuberi	Bollywood	Radha from Student of the Year	Zuberi withdrew	
10 (2013)	6	Group dance	Bollywood	Pandeyjee Seeti from Dabangg 2		
10 (2013)	9	Amy Yakima; Alex Wong	Bollywood	Munni Badnaam Hui Darling from Dabangg 2		
11 (2014)	4	Valerie Rockey; Ricky Ubeda	Bollywood	Dilliwaali Girlfriend from Yeh Jawaani Hai Deewani	Safe	
11 (2014)	6	Bridget Whitman; Brandon Bryant	Bollywood/Disco	Disco Khisko (remix) from Dil Bole Hadippa!		
11 (2014)	9	Jessica Richens; Zack Everhart, Jr.	Bollywood	Ghaghra from Yeh Jawaani Hai Deewani		
12 (2015)	2	Lily Frias; Burim Jusufi; Gaby Diaz; Edson Juarez	Bollywood	Dhol Baaje from Ek Paheli Leela	Jusufi Eliminated; Juarez Bottom 6	
12 (2015)	6	Jaja Vankova; Alex Wong	Bollywood	Naacho Re from Jai Ho soundtrack	Safe	
13 (2016)	2	Contestants & All-stars	Bollywood	Let's Nacho from Kapoor & Sons		
13 (2016)	7	J.T. and Marko	Bollywood	Malhari from Bajirao Mastani		
14 (2017)	2	Inyoung "Dassy" Lee; DuShuant "Fik-Shun" Stegall	Bollywood	Radha Nachegi from Tevar		
14 (2017)	6	Kaylee Millis; Kiki Nyemchek	Bollywood	Gallan Goodiyan from Dil Dhadakne Do	Millis eliminated	
15 (2018)	2	Magda Fialek; Darius Hickman	Bollywood	Badri Ki Dulhania from Badrinath Ki Dulhania		
16 (2019)	14	Sophie Pittman; Bailey Muñoz	Bollywood	Butterfly from Jab Harry Met Sejal		

==== So You Think You Can Dance (Canada, 2008) ====
Mahajan choreographed the group dance performance of Nagada, Nagada from Jab We Met in So You Think You Can Dance Canada (season 1).

==== Superstars of Dance ====
Mahajan coached team India at the Superstars of Dance on the NBC Network and choreographed six remaining crews at the 2009 ABDCrews (season 4).

==== Dance India Dance ====
Mahajan was selected as a judge for the 2015 edition of Dance India Dance North America (filmed in Mumbai).

==== Dance Moms ====
For the Season 6, Episode 5 edition of the reality TV show Dance Moms, Mahajan coached the Abby Lee Dance Company Team, when Abby Lee Miller unexpectedly failed to attend practice sessions and competition.

==== The World's Best ====
Selected to the Wall of the World, a panel of global entertainment experts for The World's Best, a reality talent competition produced by CBS, Mahajan served as a judge.

=== Cancer ===
==== Diagnosis ====
A 2012 diagnosis of Stage 2 testicular cancer and subsequent chemotherapy treatment interrupted Mahajan's career.

==== Check Yourself ====
In 2014, Mahajan choreographed a section of Paula Abdul's performance in Check Yourself, a breast cancer PSA (public service announcement) production by Avon Products. Abdul, Mahajan, Chucky Klapow, and Renee Ritchie received a 2015 World Choreography Award for this work, in the category Digital Format.

=== White House Diwali Celebration ===
Following a tradition started by George W. Bush in 2003, an annual Diwali celebration takes place at the White House. For the 2013 edition of the White House Diwali celebration, First Lady Michelle Obama hosted a Bollywood dance workshop instructed and choreographed by Mahajan. A photo of Michelle Obama dancing a Bollywood routine alongside Mahajan was cited as one of the top White House photos of 2013.

=== Miss America 2014 Pageant ===
Mahajan choreographed the Bollywood-Indian classical dance fusion routine performed by Nina Davuluri (2014 Miss America and the first Miss America of Indian descent) at the Miss America 2014 Talent competition; the routine was set to the song Dhoom Taana, from the film Om Shanti Om. Davuluri's performance of this routine marked the first time a Bollywood dance routine had been performed on the Miss America stage.

Mahajan was named to The American Bazaar's Top 10 Indian American Entertainers of 2013.

=== Film ===
As associate choreographer, Mahajan choreographed the Bollywood scenes in the 2019 film High Strung Free Dance (a sequel to High Strung).

=== Animation ===
==== Mira, Royal Detective ====
In 2019, Mahajan embraced the opportunity to work as the Choreographer and Indian Dance Consultant for the production of Mira, Royal Detective. Described as "an animated mystery-adventure series for preschoolers, inspired by the cultures and customs of India" , the Disney Junior series features original song and dance in each episode. Tasked with showcasing the diversity of Indian culture through choreography, Mahajan created original dance sequences for the cast of animated human and animal characters, ensuring representation of northern and southern Indian styles of dance, as well as Bollywood productions.

==== Mickey Mouse Mixed-Up Adventures ====
In two episodes of Disney Television Animation's animated children's television series Mickey Mouse Mixed-Up Adventures, the characters embark on adventures that showcase Indian culture on a Bollywood film set and a trip to New Delhi. The Bollywood and Indian Dance choreography for these episodes was performed by Mahajan.

== Awards ==
- 2011 University of California, Riverside Outstanding Young Alumnus Award
- 2015 India Empire Awards: Excellence in Performing Arts
- 2015 World Choreography Award (Category: Digital Format), with Paula Abdul, Chucky Klapow, Renee Ritchie
