= Smack =

Smack(s) may refer to:

- Slapping (strike), a broad stroke made with the open hand
- Spanking, a form of corporal punishment
- slang term for Heroin, a narcotic drug
- Smack (ship), a small decked or half-decked vessel
- Smack talk, the use of threatening or intentionally inflammatory language
- A collective noun for a group of jellyfish
- An onomatopoetic word for a kiss
- Honey Smacks, a breakfast cereal sometimes marketed simply as Smacks

== Computer software ==
- Smack (software), a Linux kernel mandatory access control mechanism

== Arts and entertainment ==
- Smack (American band), a 2000s pop/rock band
- Smack (Finnish band), a 1980s rock band
- Smack (Brazilian band), a 1980s post-punk band
- Smack (novel) or Junk, a 1996 novel by Melvin Burgess
- "Smack", a song by Zion I and The Grouch, a B-side of the single "Lift Me Up"

== See also ==
- Trash-talk
