= National Dance Day =

Annual US celebration in September

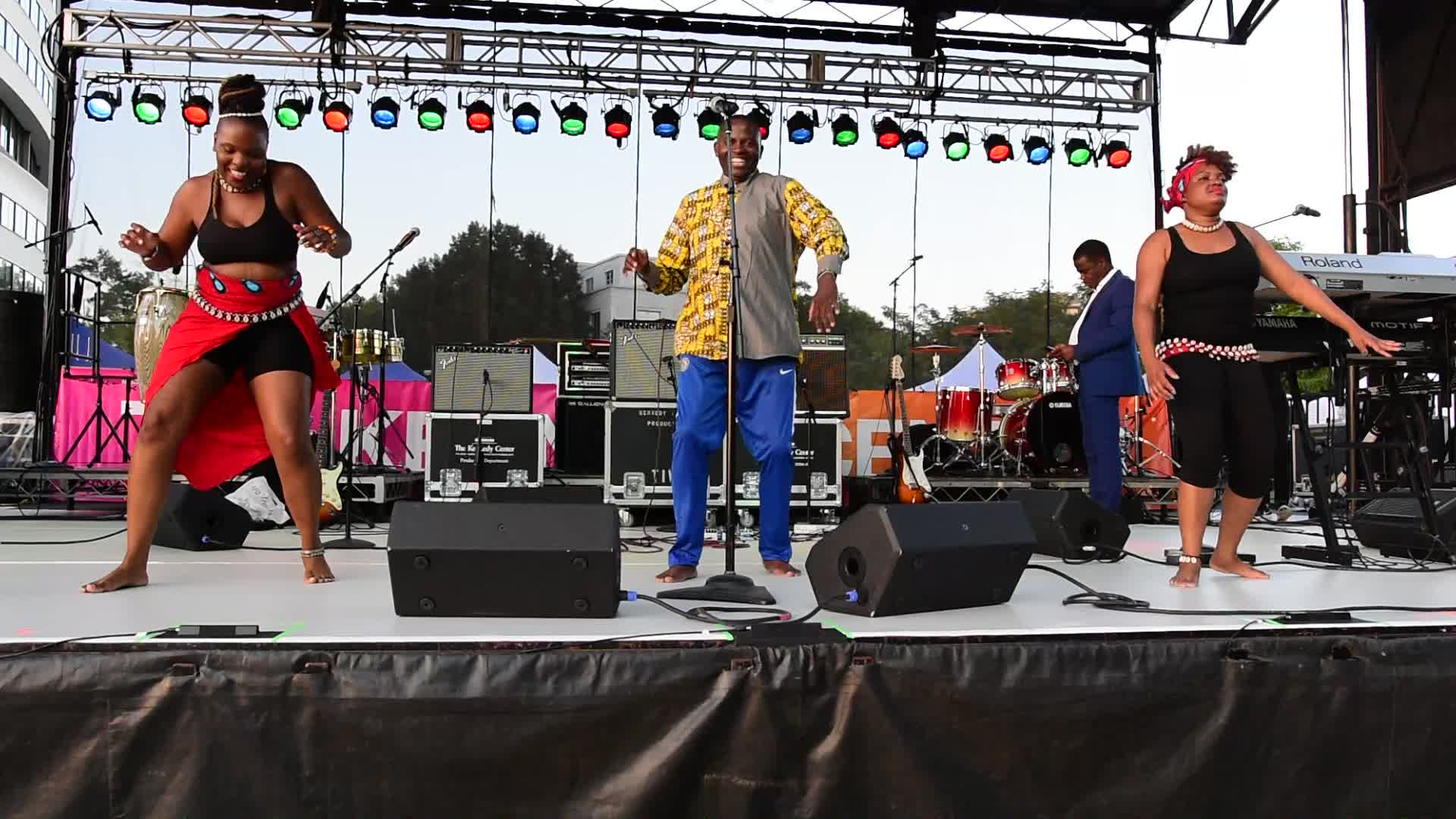
Dancers participate in a National Dance Day event at the John F. Kennedy Center for the Performing Arts, 2018

National Dance Day was launched in 2010 by Nigel Lythgoe, the co-creator of So You Think You Can Dance and co-founder of American Dance Movement (formerly the Dizzy Feet Foundation) in partnership with American congresswoman Eleanor Holmes Norton who introduced a National Dance Day resolution to express support for dance as a form of valuable exercise and of artistic expression. As of 2019, National Dance Day is celebrated in the United States annually on the third Saturday in September; the next celebration is September 21, 2024. Prior to 2019 celebrations were held on the last Saturday in July.
