= Sarah McCreanor =

Australian dancer and content creator (born 1992)

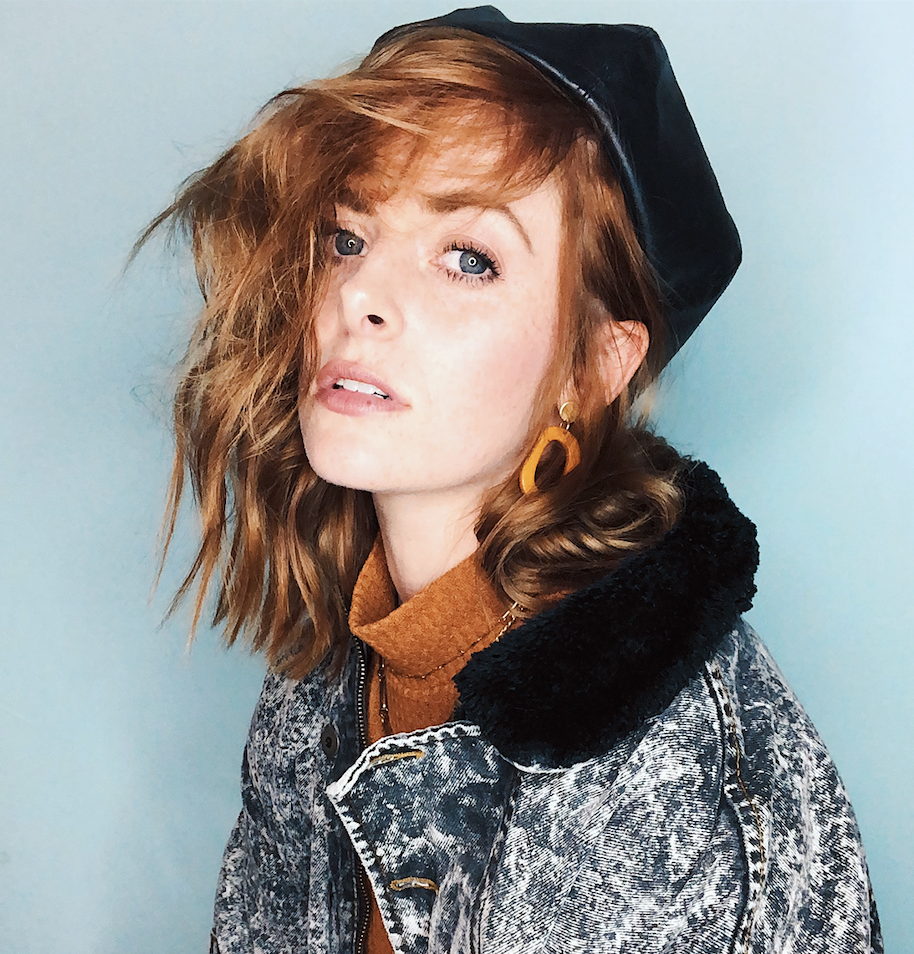
- Born: 2 August 1992 (age 34); Brisbane, Australia
- Occupations: actor; dancer; comedian; content creator; photographer

TikTok information
- Page: smacmccreanor
- Followers: 2.8 million

YouTube information
- Channel: Smac McCreanor
- Subscribers: 1.67 million
- Views: 1.24 billion
- Last updated: 17 November 2024
- Website: smacmccreanor.com

Sarah McCreanor (born 2 August 1992), known professionally as "Smac" and Hydraulic Press Girl, is an Australian actor, dancer, comedian, and content creator. She is known for her content series in which she moves her body to imitate objects being crushed in hydraulic presses. Among other activities, she has performed in about 70 television commercials.

== Early life ==
McCreanor was born on 2 August 1992 in Brisbane, Australia. She began dance classes at 5, later developing an interest in slapstick humour. Such interests were largely inspired by Australian comedy duo Lano and Woodley and actors Jim Carrey and Rowan Atkinson (Mr. Bean). At the Queensland Academy for Creative Industries, McCreanor majored in Theatre and Visual Arts and graduated in 2009.

== Career ==
From 2012 to 2013, she starred in the How to Train Your Dragon Arena Spectacular show, sharing her role of Astrid with American actor Gemma Nguyen. Premiering in Australia, the show toured across other countries and wrapped in Los Angeles, California. McCreanor decided to migrate to the city permanently. Afterwards, a significant portion of McCreanor's revenue originated from her work in the commercial industry; from 2013 to 2022, she took part in around 70 commercials. She produced promotional content for companies such as Netflix, Levi's, and Warner Bros. Besides acting in TV shows and music videos, McCreanor was a dance participant in the American version of So You Think You Can Dance and Dancing with Myself in 2019 and 2022 respectively. She has also frequently made photography sessions and owns production studios in downtown Los Angeles.

On the Internet, McCreanor started making videos of herself imitating animals, such as chicken. Over time, she noted many reaction videos to footage of objects being crushed in hydraulic presses. McCreanor considered that the people reacting to it were mostly doing so by merely changing facial expressions without talking. With the COVID-19 pandemic lockdowns, these reactions prompted her to start Hydraulic Press Girl, a series of usually sped up videos in which she makes body movements with colourful clothing to mimic an object being crushed, with both her dance and the object video shown side-by-side. She posted the first Hydraulic Press Girl video in December 2020 on TikTok with footage from the YouTube account Hydraulic Press Channel. In her words, Hydraulic Press Girl portrayed art as more of a "living fluid [...] than a static inert sort of object we admire at a distance." According to her website, the series probably began getting viral in early 2021, and since that year, she began using her own small press for the videos. She celebrated her 100th "press" in June 2022.

== Public image and reception ==
The viral Hydraulic Press Girl series has been regarded as the main contributor to her online fame. Roberto Badillo of El Heraldo de México considered McCreanor one of the most admired influencers of her country. She reached over 1.6 million YouTube subscribers and 1 billion views by February 2024. On TikTok, she had over 1.6 million followers by October 2021 and over 2.6 million by February 2024.

She was listed in Adweek's 2022 Creative 100 awards, with Natalie Venegas praising her "quirky and fun" online videos and collaborations with other creators. In Meta Platforms' 2022 "Creators of Tomorrow", McCreanor was acknowledged for "Creative Excellence". The National Gallery of Victoria chose clips from the Hydraulic Press Girl series to be shown at its 2023-24 Triennial exhibition. The gallery's marketing team wrote that McCreanor's work had a "union of inconsequential violence and humour, irony and performance [that] culminate in a visceral response to the potential of the human body".

=== Billy Studios controversy ===
In a viral November 2022 TikTok video, McCreanor shared private messages from an unnamed influencer to the Instagram business account of a studio that McCreanor ran, Billy Studios. After McCreanor had allegedly rejected the influencer's request to make a photo session in the studio for free, the influencer sent voice notes criticising the studio for not knowing "how influencers work". The anonymous person reportedly spammed McCreanor and the studio's website with emails and complaints. Mara Leighton of Business Insider opined that the occurrence showed the "culture of entitlement" present in the influencer community.

== Filmography ==
Television performances
Year	Title	Role	Notes	Ref.
2019	So You Think You Can Dance	Contestant	Season 16	
2022	Dancing with Myself	Contestant	Episode: "Open Those Pods"	
