= Third platform =

The third platform is a term coined by marketing firm International Data Corporation (IDC) for a model of a computing platform. It was promoted as inter-dependencies between mobile computing, social media, cloud computing, and information / analytics (big data), and possibly the Internet of things. The term was in use in 2013, and possibly earlier. Gartner claimed that these interdependent trends were "transforming the way people and businesses relate to technology" and have since provided a number of reports on the topic.

== Platforms ==
The paradigm of numbered platforms sees several platforms evolving, the first platform as the mainframe computer system.

=== First Platform ===
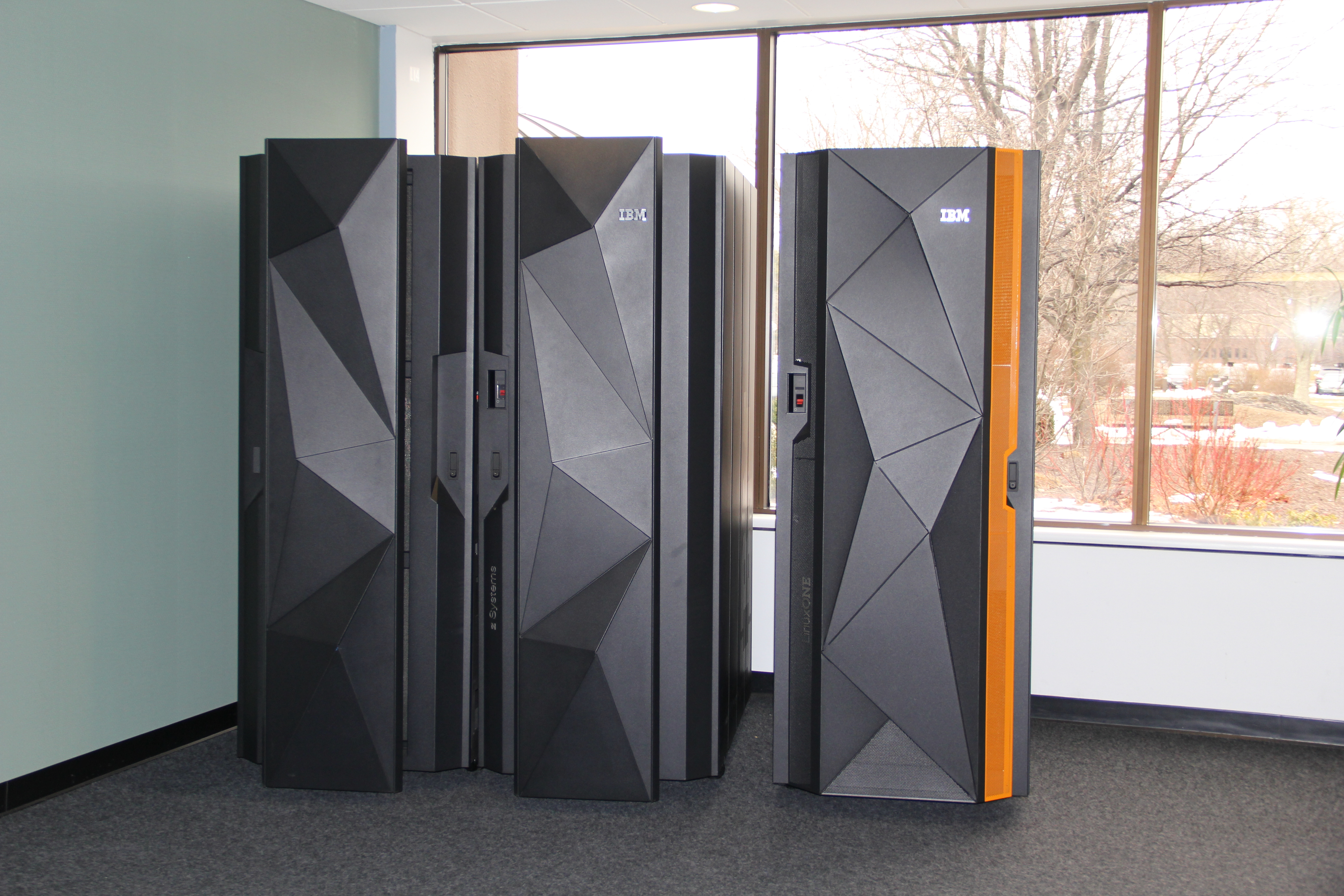
First Platform: A pair of IBM mainframes. On the left is the IBM z Systems z13. On the right is the IBM LinuxONE Rockhopper.

First Platform (Mainframe) - late 1950s to present

The first platform is the mainframe computer system, which began in the late 1950s and continues today.

=== Second Platform ===
Second Platform: A computer network diagram of clients communicating with a server via the Internet.

Second Platform (Client/Server) - mid 1980s to present

The second platform is the client/server system, which began in the mid-1980s with PCs tapping into mainframe databases and applications.

=== Third Platform ===
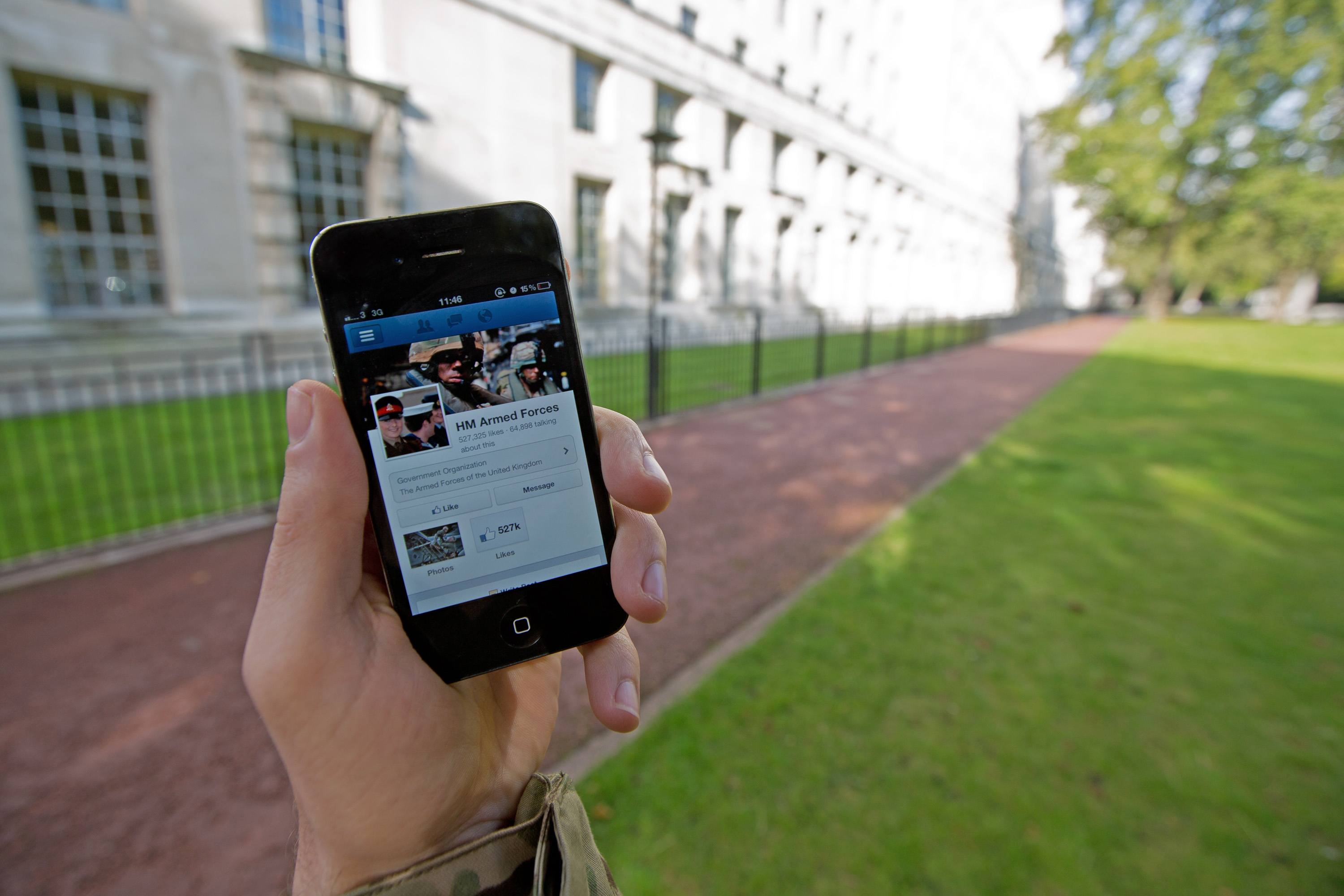
Third Platform: A Facebook page on a mobile device.

Third Platform (Social, Mobile, Cloud & Analytics, possibly IoT) - early 2010s to present

The Open Platform 3.0 initiative of The Open Group aims to produce a consensus definition of the third platform, and to identify open standards for it, in order to help enterprises gain business benefit from these technologies. This has produced an analysis of requirements.

In January 2016 The Economist offered the following analysis: "The third platform is based on the online computing "cloud" and its interaction with all manner of devices, including wirelessly connected ones such as smartphones, machinery and sensors (known collectively as the "internet of things").

=== Fourth Platform ===
Fourth Platform -- despite the term being used by some consultants and IT companies, there is no clear consensus on a definition. Discussions around the fourth platform are currently mostly predictions about what it might include - such as AI, IoT, Quantum Computing and massively distributed Grid computing approaches.

== Implementations ==
No single "third platform" product has emerged, but there are a number of proprietary and free software products that enterprises can use to create, deploy and operate solutions that use third platform technologies. Within an enterprise, a combination of these products that meet enterprise needs is a "third platform" for that enterprise. Its design can be considered part of Enterprise Architecture.

Suitable products include:

- The Eclipse integrated development environment
- The Cloud Foundry cloud application platform as a service
- The Docker container environment
- The Kubernetes container deployment and management environment
- The Apache Hadoop big data framework

Enterprise third platforms can use web APIs to access social media websites and cloud services giving access to third platform technologies.

== The Pillars of the Third Platform ==
=== Social technology ===
Gartner defined a social technology as, “Any technology that facilitates social interactions and is enabled by a communications capability, such as the Internet or a mobile device.” This extends not only to social media but also to all social technologies that make social interaction possible. A VoIP service, for example, would be considered a social technology.

In a trend that has been described as ‘social everything’, companies both big and small, will continue to inject a social element into every product and service. The cloud provides the infrastructure that makes the information accessible, the social technology helps to organise the data and facilitate access, and the mobile devices will provide the means by which most people receive the data.

=== Mobile devices ===
The third platform is designed to give everybody access to big data via mobile devices. A company representative on the road or working from home will have instant access to data through his or her mobile device with this third platform whenever and wherever they need it.

An example of the use of mobile devices in the third platform would be a school that gives every student a tablet. The tablet would take the place of textbooks and paper used in assignments, but more importantly, the student will have access to a virtual classroom at additional times.

=== Analytics (big data) ===
The concept behind big data is to maximize the utility of all data. An executive at a company that streamlines its business functions with the third platform would have easy access to all of the data, including sales figures, personnel information, accounting data, financials and so on. This data can then be used to inform more areas of the business.

Big data can be further differentiated once we analyze its three distinguishing features: variety, volume, and velocity.

Variety means that many forms of data are collected, with formats ranging from audio and video to client log files and Tweets. Volume represents the fact that big data must come in massive quantities, often over a petabyte. Finally, Velocity signifies that big data must be constantly collected for maximum effectiveness; even data that is a few days old is not ideal.

In summary, big data utilizes and collects all forms of data, gathered from both traditional and digital sources, in order to complement a company's decision-making processes.

=== Cloud services ===
Cloud services provide access to big data and mobile device infrastructure from outside the office.

This differs greatly from the first platform, where computer networks consisted of large mainframes. All of a company's employees had access to the data in the mainframe but they could only access it through their desktop computers. In the second platform, a company's employees could access the data in the mainframe as well as outside data, via an Internet connection.

The third platform will allow all of a company's IT solutions to be available through the cloud, accessible via a variety of mobile devices. Data storage, servers and many IT solutions, which are on-site, can now be cloud-based.

=== Internet of Things ===
The Internet of Things is the network of connected devices that enable computer systems to monitor and control aspects of the physical environment. It has applications in personal and home environments, smart cities, factory automation, transport, and many other areas. The incorporation of the Internet of Things in the third platform gives enterprises the ability to interact with these systems and use these applications.

Sensors and actuators have been used in computer systems for many years. It is the ability to connect to such devices anywhere in the world through the Internet that characterizes the Internet of things.

== Alternate Names ==
- CAMSS (IBM): Cloud, Analytics, Mobile, Social, Security.
- 3rd Platform (IDC)
- Nexus of Forces (Gartner)
- SMAC or SMAC Stack (Cognizant)
- Idea Economy (HPE)
