= Oksana Platero =

Ukrainian ballroom and Latin dancer (born 1988)

- Оксана Дмитренко
- Born: Oksana Dmytrenko; 29 October 1988 (age 37); Ukraine
- Occupation: Ballroom dancer
- Spouse: Jonathan Platero

Oksana (Dmytrenko) Platero (Ukrainian: Оксана Дмитренко) is a Ukrainian ballroom and Latin dancer. She spent five seasons as a member of the troupe on Dancing with the Stars in the United States. She joined the United Kingdom's Strictly Come Dancing as a professional dancer in series 14.

== Early life ==
Oksana Dmytrenko was born on 29 October 1988 in Ukraine. Dmytrenko's father left the family when she was five years old, leaving her mother, Inna, to raise Oksana as a single parent. The family lived in the city of Kharkiv where Inna sold clothing. At age six, Inna enrolled Dmytrenko in dance lessons. Dmytrenko has one younger brother, who was born in Ukraine after Oksana moved to the United States. In 2017, she joined Mira Quien Baila as a professional dancer in season 5.

== Career ==
Oksana began competing as a Latin and ballroom dancer with partner Artem Plakhotnyi and later Igor Kantsedal. In 2004 she began partnering with Aleksandr Altukhov. The pair first competed for Ukraine and then moved to the United States when she was 18 years old.

In 2011, Oksana became a member of the first "Troupe" on Dancing with the Stars season 12. She would remain part of the troupe for five seasons, through season 16. After leaving Dancing with the Stars she performed with Ballroom with a Twist. She also choreographed for So You Think You Can Dance.

=== Strictly Come Dancing ===
In 2016, the BBC announced Platero would join Strictly Come Dancing as a professional dancer in series 14. She was paired with television personality Robert "Judge" Rinder. The pair were eliminated in the Quarterfinals and finished in 5th place. The BBC on June 21, 2017 announced that Platero was leaving Strictly Come Dancing after one series.

Series	Partner	Place	Average score
14	Judge Rinder	5th	29.6

==== Series 14 performances ====
Week No.	Dance/Song	Judges' score				Total	Result
Week No.	Dance/Song	Horwood	Bussell	Goodman	Tonioli	Total	Result
1	Cha-Cha-Cha / "Mercy"	6	7	6	6	25	None
2	American Smooth / "Marvin Gaye"	6	7	7	7	27	Safe
3	Charleston / "Meet the Flintstones"	7	8	6	6	27	Safe
4	Viennese Waltz / "Boom Bang-a-Bang"	6	7	7	7	27	Safe
5	Jive / "Boogie Woogie Bugle Boy"	6	8	8	7	29	Safe
6	Paso Doble / "Born This Way"	8	8	8	8	32	Safe
7	Quickstep / "It Don't Mean a Thing (If It Ain't Got That Swing)"	8	9	8	8	33	Safe
8	Foxtrot / "You Make Me Feel So Young"	7	9	9	8	33	Safe
9	Salsa / "Spice Up Your Life"	8	9	8	8	33	Safe
10	Rumba / "Lean on Me"	6	8	8	7	29	Bottom two
10	Cha-Cha-Cha Challenge / "I Like It Like That"	Awarded	2	Extra	Points	31	Bottom two
11	Samba / "December, 1963 (Oh, What a Night)"	7	8	8	8	31	Eliminated

== Personal life ==
Dmytrenko married fellow dancer and So You Think You Can Dance alum Jonathan Platero in 2014. The wedding was featured on David Tutera: CELEBrations.
