= Mandy Moore (choreographer) =

American choreographer

- Born: Samantha Jo Moore; March 28, 1976 (age 50); St. Louis, Missouri, US
- Occupations: Choreographer, dancer, producer, dance instructor
- Years active: 1994—present
- Awards: Primetime Emmy Award for Outstanding Choreography (2017, 2018, and 2020)

Samantha Jo "Mandy" Moore (born March 28, 1976) is an American dancer, choreographer, dance instructor and producer. She is known for her work on the United States reality television series So You Think You Can Dance, having appeared on the show every year since the third season, and Dancing with the Stars. She choreographed the 2016 film La La Land and has also worked on commercials and various musical productions such as Taylor Swift's The Eras Tour. She has created dance numbers for the Academy Awards, Golden Globe Awards, Emmy Awards, and Grammy Awards ceremonies. She has been nominated seven times for a Primetime Emmy Award for Outstanding Choreography, winning in 2017 for her work on Dancing with the Stars, in 2018 for her work on So You Think You Can Dance, and in 2020 for Zoey's Extraordinary Playlist.

== Early life and education ==
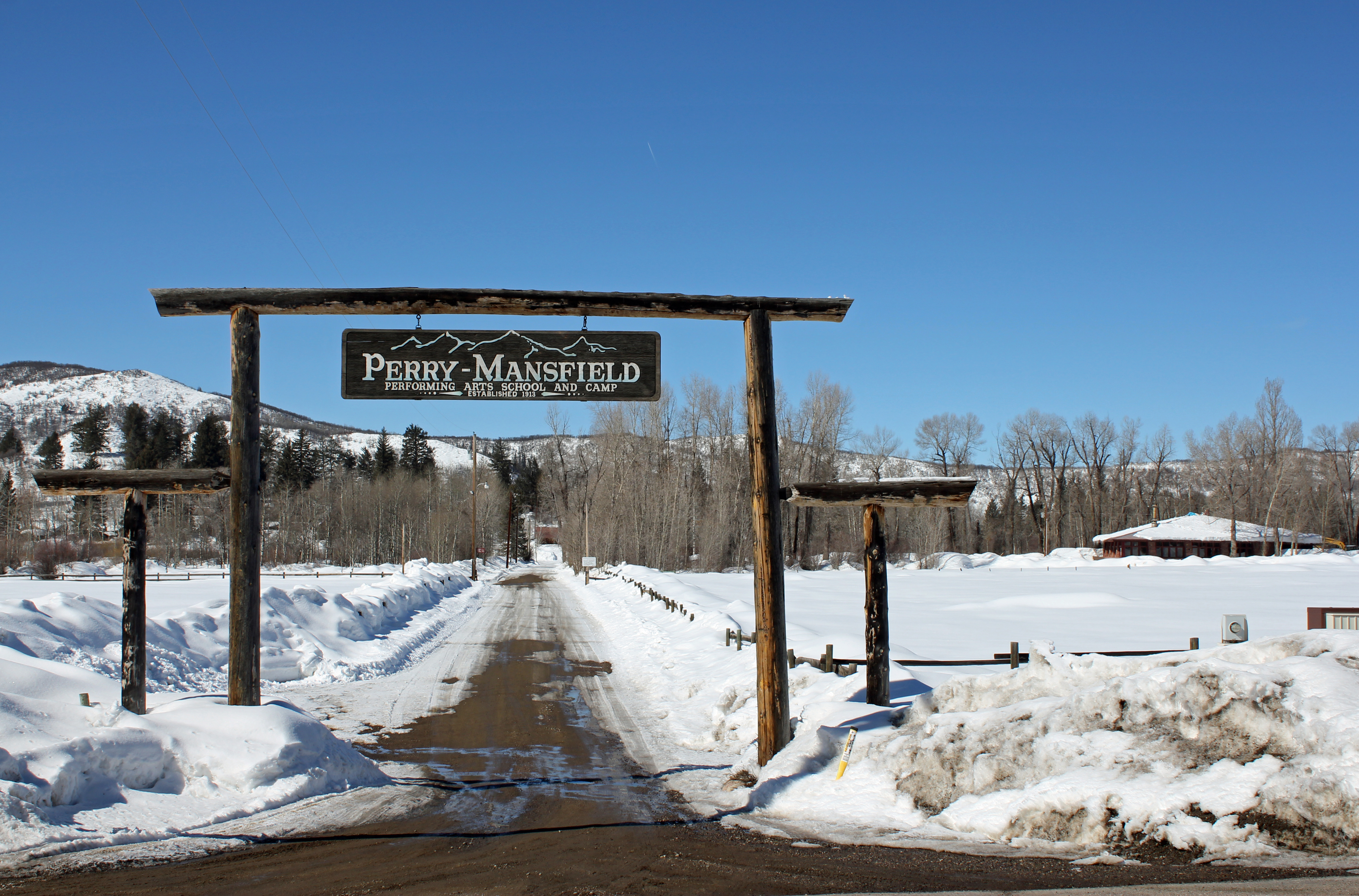
Entrance to the Perry-Mansfield Performing Arts School & Camp

Samantha Jo Moore was born on March 28, 1976, in St. Louis, Missouri, and grew up in Summit County, Colorado. Her parents are Bob and Wendy Moore, and she has one sister. She enjoyed dancing from a very young age. A public school student, she studied at the Summit School of Dance in Breckenridge under the school's founder, Kim Delgrosso, from age 7 to 18. She also attended the Perry-Mansfield Performing Arts School & Camp in Steamboat Springs for three summers. While attending Summit High School, she attended the Shelly True Dance Academy in Denver several times a week. She also participated in high school basketball, track, and gymnastics.

Moore moved to Los Angeles after graduating from high school in 1994 to pursue a career in dance. She attended the EDGE Performing Arts Center in Los Angeles on a scholarship from the Summit Foundation.

== Career ==
=== Television ===
Moore was first hired by Carrie Ann Inaba to help out with some television dance projects, which led to her assisting with auditions for the reality show So You Think You Can Dance. She signed on for season 1 of So You Think You Can Dance as assistant to the choreographer. By season 3 she was choreographing dance numbers and by season 14 she was serving as creative producer. In 2018 she was named as a judge for Dancing with the Stars: Juniors. She was a guest judge (fill in), replacing Craig Revel Horwood on the first episode of Dancing with the Stars (Australian Season 17).

Among her television credits are Glee and American Idol (Fox), The Fresh Beat Band (Nickelodeon), Disney's 60th Anniversary Celebration (ABC), Modern Family, and "XQ Super School Live". Moore is an executive producer of NBC's musical comedy-drama Zoey's Extraordinary Playlist, as well as the show's choreographer. She also appears as the auditioner in episode 11.

=== Film ===
Moore has choreographed dance numbers for several David O. Russell films, starting with Silver Linings Playbook (2012)—for which she trained actors Bradley Cooper and Jennifer Lawrence to perform a mashup of different dance styles—American Hustle (2013), and Joy (2015); she also did choreography for Leslye Headland's Sleeping With Other People (2015) and Disney's 2025 live-action remake of Snow White.

Her most notable work to date is the 2016 film La La Land, for which she choreographed all the dance numbers, both large-scale and small-scale. To choreograph the opening number, "Another Day of Sun", which took place in a traffic jam on a Los Angeles freeway ramp, Moore blocked out the action on paper and then began staging the moves using a group of ten dancers in a studio parking lot. The final scene involved 30 dancers, 100 extras, and 60 cars. Moore trained the lead actors, Ryan Gosling and Emma Stone, both dance novices, over a period of six to eight weeks. She emphasized emotion rather than technique, as Stone recalled:

"[Moore] tried to impart to us that, as much as we need to be technical and think of all of our steps, it's going to be about our faces. We need to see the joy and connection. We need to look at each other and smile at each other. We need to keep acting".

=== Stage ===
Moore's stage credits include the New Wave L.A. Program created by the Los Angeles Ballet, a segment of Celine Dion's 2008 Taking Chances World Tour, Strictly Come Dancing, Cirque du Soleil's Michael Jackson: The Immortal World Tour; Shania Twain's Las Vegas show, Shania: Still the One, and Taylor Swift's The Eras Tour.

Moore directed and choreographed the Aurora Fox Arts Center's production of The Wedding Singer in 2011, and was the choreographer for the world premiere of the 2013 musical "Nobody Loves You" at the Old Globe Theatre in San Diego, California, which she subsequently brought Off-Broadway to the Second Stage Theater in Manhattan.

=== Music video ===
Following Moore's work on Taylor Swift's The Eras Tour, she choreographed the music videos for "The Fate of Ophelia" and "Opalite, two singles from Swift's 2025 album The Life of a Showgirl.

=== Other venues ===
Moore has also choreographed routines for commercials, awards ceremonies, and fund-raisers. Her commercial credits include ads for Target, Amazon Prime, and Skechers. In 2017 she choreographed dance numbers for four of the five major US awards ceremonies—the Academy Awards, Golden Globe Awards, Emmy Awards, and Grammy Awards. For the Golden Globes ceremony that year, she choreographed Jimmy Fallon's opening take-off on the "Another Day of Sun" film scene. Among the fund-raisers she has choreographed are "Dancing with the Mountain Stars", a fund-raiser for the St. Anthony Summit Medical Center, and the 21st Annual Steve Chase Humanitarian Awards in Palm Springs, California, in 2015, benefitting the Desert AIDS Project.

=== Professional dancing ===
Moore has danced on film in A Time for Dancing (2002), Austin Powers in Goldmember (2002), and Did You Hear About the Morgans? (2008), and in the television sitcom Malcolm in the Middle.

=== Teaching ===
Moore teaches at the EDGE Performing Arts Center and is a faculty member of JUMP weekend dance conventions for children. She also teaches in private studios and has led dance workshops in Italy (Mediterraneo Dance Festival), Australia, and Korea.

She is a member of the Board of Governors of the Television Academy, and as of 2017 heads that body's Choreographers Peer Group.

== Dance styles ==
Moore is proficient in choreographing many different types of dance, including contemporary, jazz, ballroom, tap, and folk. She is known for training dancers on all levels and of all ages.

== Awards and honors ==
Award	Year	Category	Work	Result	Ref.
Chita Rivera Awards for Dance and Choreography	2025	Outstanding Choreography in a Feature Film	Snow White	Nominated	
MTV Video Music Awards	2026	Best Choreography	"The Fate of Ophelia"	Nominated	
Primetime Emmy Awards	2008	Outstanding Choreography	So You Think You Can Dance	Nominated	
Primetime Emmy Awards	2011	Outstanding Choreography	So You Think You Can Dance	Nominated	
Primetime Emmy Awards	2013	Outstanding Choreography	So You Think You Can Dance	Nominated	
Primetime Emmy Awards	2014	Outstanding Choreography	So You Think You Can Dance	Nominated	
Primetime Emmy Awards	2017	Outstanding Choreography	Dancing with the Stars	Won	
Primetime Emmy Awards	2017	Outstanding Choreography	So You Think You Can Dance	Nominated	
Primetime Emmy Awards	2018	Outstanding Choreography	So You Think You Can Dance	Won	
Primetime Emmy Awards	2020	Outstanding Choreography	Zoey's Extraordinary Playlist	Won	
Primetime Emmy Awards	2021	Outstanding Choreography	Zoey's Extraordinary Playlist	Nominated	
Primetime Emmy Awards	2021	Outstanding Choreography	Zoey's Extraordinary Playlist	Nominated	
Primetime Emmy Awards	2022	Outstanding Choreography	Zoey's Extraordinary Christmas	Nominated	
Primetime Emmy Awards	2024	Outstanding Choreography	96th Academy Awards	Nominated	
Primetime Emmy Awards	2025	Outstanding Choreography	97th Academy Awards	Nominated	
Primetime Emmy Awards	2026	Outstanding Choreography	98th Academy Awards	Nominated	

== Personal life ==
To avoid being confused with the better-known actress-singer Mandy Moore, Moore registered with the Screen Actors Guild under the name Mandy Jo Moore. Still, the two are often confused, and with tongue in cheek, Moore named her corporation "Nope Not Her". She also uses the handle @nopenother on social media.
