= Dance in film =

Dance as depicted and performed in film

Dance in film refers to the portrayal and performance of dance in cinema, from films centred on dancers and their lives to individual dance sequences within a larger story. It includes ballet, ballroom, tap, swing, tango, hip-hop and other dance traditions represented on screen.

Dance can be central to a film's story or appear in a single scene, whether through a staged performance, social dancing or documentary footage. (Note: This article concerns dance depicted or performed in films. It is distinct from Dance film and Dance for camera as screen-based artistic forms. Musical films are included where dance is relevant to the film.)

== Films featuring dance, by style ==
=== Ballet ===
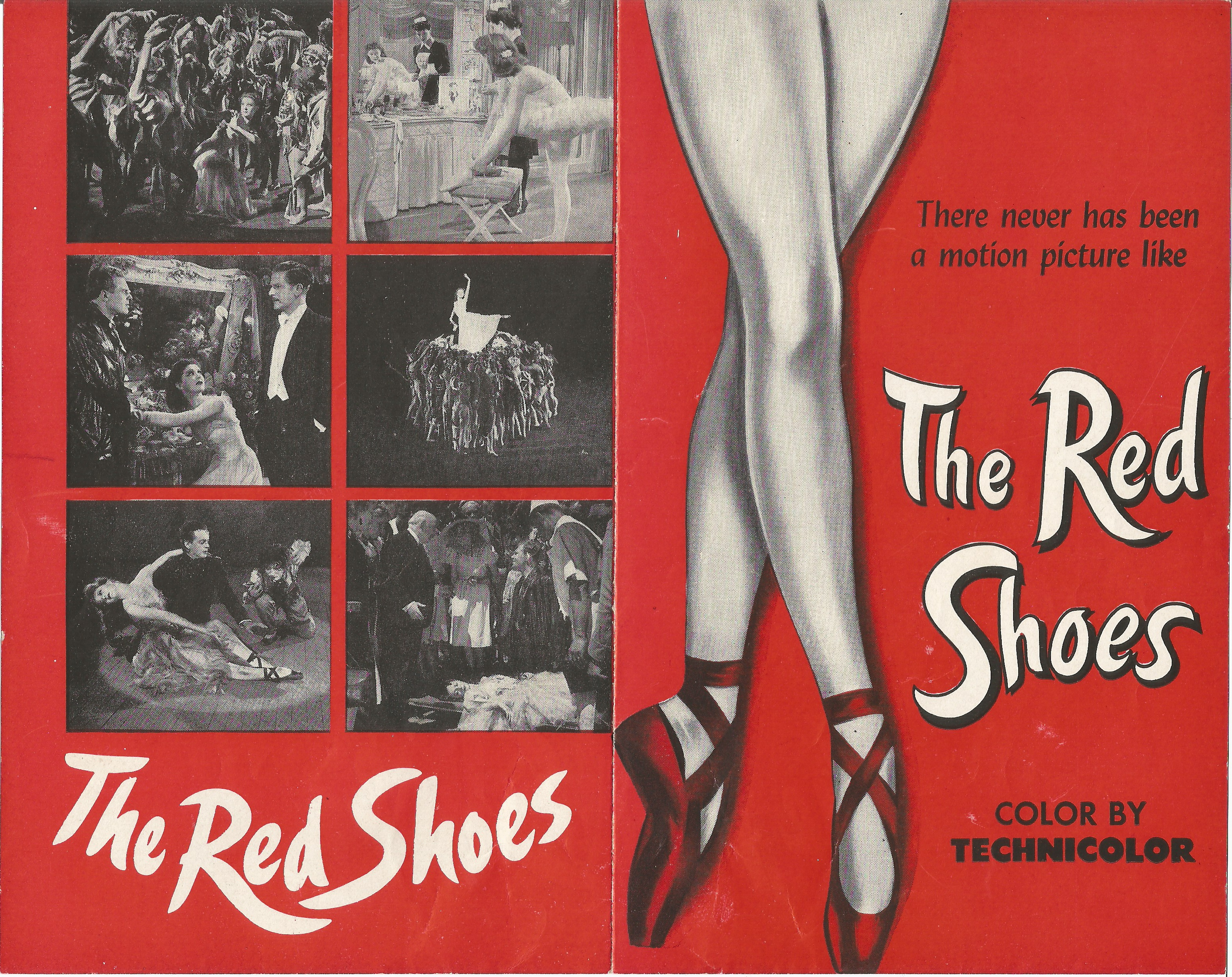
Poster for 'The Red Shoes' (1948)

- The Red Shoes (1948) – Directed by Michael Powell and Emeric Pressburger and starring Moira Shearer, the film features a 17-minute central ballet sequence that combines music, dance and cinematic imagery.
- The Tales of Hoffmann (1951) – Directed by Michael Powell and Emeric Pressburger, the adaptation of Jacques Offenbach's opera incorporates ballet choreographed by Frederick Ashton, using stylized sets and cinematic effects to integrate dance with the film's fantastical narrative.
- An American in Paris (1951) – Directed by Vincente Minnelli, the musical culminates in a 17-minute ballet choreographed by Gene Kelly, featuring Kelly and Leslie Caron amid sets inspired by French painting.
- Suspiria (1977) – A horror film directed by Dario Argento, starring Jessica Harper as an American ballet student who discovers sinister activity at a German dance academy.
- The Turning Point (1977) – Directed by Herbert Ross and starring Shirley MacLaine and Anne Bancroft, the film follows two former ballet dancers whose contrasting choices between professional performance and family life are revisited when their lives intersect again. The cast also includes Mikhail Baryshnikov and Leslie Browne.
- White Nights (1985) – Mikhail Baryshnikov and Gregory Hines bring ballet and tap together in a Cold War drama, featuring an opening performance of Roland Petit's Le Jeune Homme et la Mort and choreography by Twyla Tharp.
- Dancers (1987) – Directed by Herbert Ross, the film follows Mikhail Baryshnikov and a ballet company rehearsing Giselle, with the dancers' offstage relationships echoing the ballet's story. Alessandra Ferri performs the title role.
- Billy Elliot (2000) – Directed by Stephen Daldry, the film follows a working-class boy pursuing ballet during the 1984–1985 British miners' strike, confronting expectations about gender and dance.
- Center Stage (2000) – Directed by Nicholas Hytner, the film follows young dancers competing for places in a professional ballet company, with rehearsals and a final performance contrasting classical and contemporary dance.
- Dracula: Pages from a Virgin's Diary (2002) – Guy Maddin transforms Mark Godden's ballet for the Royal Winnipeg Ballet into a black-and-white silent film, using expressive camerawork and editing to retell the Dracula story through dance.
- The Company (2003) – Directed by Robert Altman, the film depicts the professional and personal lives of dancers at the Joffrey Ballet in Chicago. Its screenplay draws on accounts from the company's dancers, choreographers and staff, and incorporates performances of contemporary dance works.
- Wishing Stairs (2003) – Directed by Yoon Jae-yeon, the South Korean horror film follows rival ballet students at an arts school, where jealousy and competition lead to supernatural events. Part of the Whispering Corridors series, it uses the pressures of ballet training to develop the conflict between its principal characters.
- Flying Boys (2004) – Directed by Byun Young-joo, the South Korean coming-of-age drama follows high-school students reluctantly attending ballet classes, where dance becomes part of their experiences of friendship, romance and growing independence. The actors trained in ballet for approximately two months to prepare for the film's dance scenes.
- Dancing with Time (2007) – Directed by Trevor Peters, the German documentary follows four former members of the Leipzig Ballet, now approaching their eighties, as they return to the stage under choreographer Heike Hennig. The film combines rehearsals and performances at Oper Leipzig with accounts of the dancers' professional and personal histories.
- Ballet Shoes (2007) – Directed by Sandra Goldbacher, this BBC adaptation of Noel Streatfeild's novel follows three adopted sisters, Pauline, Petrova and Posy Fossil, as they pursue their interests in the performing arts, including ballet.
- Center Stage: Turn It Up (2008) – A dance drama sequel following Kate Parker, who pursues a career after being rejected by the American Ballet Academy. Its dance sequences combine ballet and hip-hop styles.
- Mao's Last Dancer (2009) – Directed by Bruce Beresford and based on the autobiography of Li Cunxin, the Australian biographical drama follows a young Chinese ballet dancer whose training in Beijing leads to an exchange with the Houston Ballet and a decision to remain in the United States. Ballet sequences choreographed by Graeme Murphy and Janet Vernon trace Li's development as a dancer amid political and cultural tensions.
- Black Swan (2010) – Directed by Darren Aronofsky and starring Natalie Portman, the psychological horror film follows a ballerina cast in a production of Swan Lake, exploring the physical and psychological pressures of pursuing perfection in ballet.
- Tutu Much (2010) – Directed by Elise Swerhone, the Canadian documentary follows nine young dancers attending a four-week summer intensive at the Royal Winnipeg Ballet School, where they audition for admission to its professional training programme. The film documents the demands of ballet training and the uncertainty of selection.
- First Position (2012) – Directed by Bess Kargman, the documentary follows six young dancers from different backgrounds competing at the Youth America Grand Prix, where scholarships and professional opportunities are at stake. Rehearsals, performances and interviews depict the physical demands of training and the dancers' ambitions.

=== Ballroom ===
- The Story of Vernon and Irene Castle (1939) – Directed by H. C. Potter and starring Fred Astaire and Ginger Rogers, the biographical musical depicts the careers of ballroom dancers Vernon and Irene Castle, whose performances helped popularize social dances in the early twentieth century. Irene Castle served as a consultant, while Astaire and choreographer Hermes Pan recreated dances associated with the couple.
- Roseland (1977) – Directed by James Ivory, the film presents three interconnected stories set at New York City's Roseland Ballroom, titled "The Waltz", "The Hustle" and "The Peabody", exploring relationships through social dancing.
- Strictly Ballroom (1992) – Directed by Baz Luhrmann, the Australian romantic comedy-drama follows a competitive ballroom dancer who challenges established competition rules by developing his own choreography.
- Shall We Dance? (1996) – Directed by Masayuki Suo, the Japanese comedy-drama follows an office worker who secretly begins taking ballroom dance lessons.
- Dance with Me (1998) – Directed by Randa Haines and starring Vanessa L. Williams and Chayanne, the romantic dance drama follows a young Cuban dancer who joins a Houston ballroom studio preparing for an international Latin dance competition. The film contrasts formal competitive dancing with his more spontaneous approach to movement.
- Dance with the Wind (2004) – A South Korean film directed by Park Jung-woo, following a ballroom dance enthusiast who becomes the subject of an undercover police investigation. The investigating officer subsequently develops an interest in dancing.
- Shall We Dance? (2004) – Directed by Peter Chelsom and starring Richard Gere, Jennifer Lopez and Susan Sarandon, the American remake of the 1996 Japanese film follows a married lawyer who secretly takes ballroom dance lessons and discovers a new interest in performing. His training leads to a ballroom competition, with dance providing an outlet beyond his established routine.
- Mad Hot Ballroom (2005) – Directed by Marilyn Agrelo, the documentary follows fifth-grade students from three New York City public schools learning ballroom dances including the merengue, rumba and tango. The children prepare for an interschool competition, with rehearsals and performances documenting their growing confidence and teamwork.
- Marilyn Hotchkiss' Ballroom Dancing and Charm School (2005) – Directed by Randall Miller and starring Robert Carlyle, the romantic drama follows a grieving widower who begins attending ballroom dance classes after fulfilling a stranger's dying request. Through partnered dancing, including the Lindy Hop, he gradually reconnects with other people and develops a new relationship.
- Innocent Steps (2005) – A South Korean romantic comedy directed by Park Young-hoon, starring Moon Geun-young as a young woman from China who impersonates her accomplished dancer sister and trains to compete in ballroom dancing.
- Take the Lead (2006) – Directed by Liz Friedlander and starring Antonio Banderas, the dance drama follows ballroom instructor Pierre Dulaine as he teaches New York City high-school students, combining ballroom dancing with their hip-hop styles.

=== Hip Hop/Street ===
- Wild Style (1983) – Directed by Charlie Ahearn, the film portrays New York City's emerging hip-hop culture through graffiti, rapping, DJing and breaking, featuring performers including the Rock Steady Crew and Grandmaster Flash.
- Beat Street (1984) – Directed by Stan Lathan, the film follows young people involved in New York's hip-hop scene, combining a fictional story with breaking, DJing and performances by contemporary hip-hop artists.
- Body Rock (1984) – Directed by Marcelo Epstein and starring Lorenzo Lamas, the musical drama follows a performer seeking commercial success in New York City's street-dance scene, creating tensions with his dance crew.
- Breakin' (1984) – Directed by Joel Silberg, the film follows a jazz dancer who joins two street dancers in Los Angeles, combining breaking with traditional dance training.
- Breakin' 2: Electric Boogaloo (1984) – Directed by Sam Firstenberg, the sequel follows the dancers from Breakin' as they organize performances to save a community centre in East Los Angeles from demolition.
- Fast Forward (1985) – Directed by Sidney Poitier, the musical drama follows eight young dancers who travel from Ohio to New York City for a national talent competition. The film combines ballet, jazz and breaking, with dance battles and stage performances central to the story.
- Save the Last Dance (2001) – Directed by Thomas Carter and starring Julia Stiles and Sean Patrick Thomas, the romantic drama follows an aspiring ballet dancer who moves to Chicago and develops an interest in hip-hop dance, exploring racial and social differences through dance.
- Honey (2003) – Directed by Bille Woodruff and starring Jessica Alba, the dance drama follows an aspiring hip-hop choreographer who finds work in music videos while teaching dance to young people in her neighbourhood.
- You Got Served (2004) – Directed by Chris Stokes and starring Omarion and Marques Houston, the dance drama follows two friends leading a Los Angeles hip-hop dance crew as they compete in street-dance battles. Choreographers Dave Scott and Shane Sparks developed the competition sequences, combining street dancing with acrobatic movement.
- Rize (2005) – A documentary directed by David LaChapelle examining clowning and krumping in South Los Angeles, including the role of Tommy the Clown and local dancers in developing these dance forms.
- Step Up (2006) – Directed by Anne Fletcher and starring Channing Tatum and Jenna Dewan, the romantic dance drama follows a street dancer completing community service at an arts school who becomes the partner of a ballet student preparing for a major performance.
- Planet B-Boy (2007) – A documentary directed by Benson Lee following international breaking crews as they prepare for the Battle of the Year competition, examining the development and global reach of breaking.
- Stomp the Yard (2007) – Directed by Sylvain White and starring Columbus Short, the dance drama follows a Los Angeles street dancer who joins a college fraternity's stepping team. Choreographer Dave Scott, working with Jesus "Chuck" Maldonado, combined traditional stepping with hip-hop movement for the film's dance competitions.
- How She Move (2008) – Directed by Ian Iqbal Rashid and starring Rutina Wesley, the film follows a young woman who joins an all-male stepping crew and competes in a national competition. Choreographer Hi-Hat developed the stepping sequences, which were filmed with extended shots that allow the dancers' movements to be seen.
- B-Girl (2009) – Directed by Emily Dell, the independent dance drama follows a female breaker seeking to return to competition after a violent attack. The film developed from an earlier short featuring professional b-girl Jules Urich (Lady Jules), drawing on the filmmakers' involvement with Los Angeles's breaking community.
- StreetDance 3D (2010) – Directed by Max Giwa and Dania Pasquini, the British dance film brings together London street-dance crews and ballet performers, featuring Diversity and Flawless. Its stereoscopic cinematography was used to stage large-scale ensemble dance sequences in three dimensions.
- ABCD: Any Body Can Dance (2013) – Directed by choreographer Remo D'Souza and starring Prabhu Deva, the Hindi-language film follows a dance instructor training a group of Mumbai street dancers for competition. Released in stereoscopic 3D, it was described in contemporary Indian reviews as India's first 3D dance film.

=== Swing ===
With Whitey's Lindy Hoppers

- A Day at the Races (1937) – Directed by Sam Wood, the Marx Brothers comedy features Whitey's Lindy Hoppers performing the Lindy Hop in the "All God's Chillun Got Rhythm" sequence. The Harlem-based dancers bring swing dancing to the screen in an ensemble number separate from the film's main storyline.
- Hellzapoppin' (1941) – Directed by H. C. Potter, the comedy features an acrobatic Lindy Hop sequence performed by Whitey's Lindy Hoppers and choreographed by Frankie Manning. The dancers execute aerials, rapid partnered movements and synchronized ensemble choreography in a performance that became an influential filmed record of swing dancing.

Later films

- The Jungle Book (1967) – Directed by Wolfgang Reitherman, the animated musical features King Louie, voiced by jazz musician Louis Prima, leading the swing-influenced song and dance "I Wan'na Be like You". The sequence combines scat singing, character animation and jazz-inspired movement as Baloo joins the performance.
- Malcolm X (1992) – Directed by Spike Lee, the biographical drama recreates the jitterbug dancing of Malcolm's youth in Boston, using energetic social dancing to depict Black urban culture of the period. Choreographer Otis Sallid staged the film's dance sequences, with Lindy Hop pioneer Frankie Manning credited as dance consultant.
- Swing Kids (1993) – Directed by Thomas Carter, the drama follows young swing dancers in Nazi-era Germany who embrace American jazz and dancing despite increasing political repression. Choreographer Otis Sallid staged the dance-hall sequences, contrasting the dancers' freedom of expression with the conformity demanded by the Nazi regime.
- The Mask (1994) – Directed by Chuck Russell, the fantasy comedy features Jim Carrey and Cameron Diaz dancing to "Hey Pachuco" at the Coco Bongo nightclub, accompanied by Royal Crown Revue. The band's appearance gave the emerging swing revival an early mainstream audience.
- Love N' Dancing (2009) – Directed by Robert Iscove and starring Amy Smart and Tom Malloy, the romantic drama follows a schoolteacher who takes up West Coast Swing with a former champion dancer. The film features professional swing competitors, including Benji Schwimmer, Heidi Groskreutz and Jordan Frisbee, with partnered dancing central to its story.

=== Tango ===
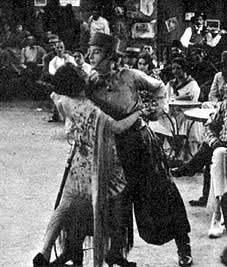
Rudolph Valentino performing a tango in The Four Horsemen of the Apocalypse (1921).

- The Four Horsemen of the Apocalypse (1921) – Directed by Rex Ingram, the silent drama features Rudolph Valentino performing a tango in a Buenos Aires bar. The sequence helped establish Valentino's screen persona and became a defining image of his early film stardom.
- Tango Bar (1987) – Directed by Marcos Zurinaga and starring Raúl Juliá, Rubén Juárez and Valeria Lynch, the Argentine–Puerto Rican musical drama follows performers reunited at a Buenos Aires tango cabaret after years of political exile. Its musical sequences present traditional and contemporary tango styles, connecting the dance with Argentina's cultural and political history.
- Scent of a Woman (1992) – Directed by Martin Brest, the drama features Al Pacino and Gabrielle Anwar performing a tango in a New York hotel ballroom. Choreographers Jerry Mitchell and Paul Pellicoro trained the actors for three and a half weeks, with the sequence filmed over four days.
- The Tango Lesson (1997) – Written and directed by Sally Potter, who stars alongside Argentine tango dancer Pablo Verón, the black-and-white drama follows a filmmaker learning tango and exploring the relationship between artistic control and partnered dancing. Verón choreographed the film's dance sequences, which were filmed by cinematographer Robby Müller.
- Tango (1998) – Directed by Carlos Saura and photographed by Vittorio Storaro, the Argentine–Spanish musical drama follows a director creating a tango production. Choreographers Juan Carlos Copes, Ana María Stekelman and Carlos Rivarola developed dance sequences exploring tango's styles and Argentine history, including a staged response to the country's military dictatorship.
- Assassination Tango (2003) – Written and directed by Robert Duvall, the drama follows an American hitman in Buenos Aires who becomes fascinated by Argentine tango while awaiting an assignment. Featuring dancer Luciana Pedraza, the film incorporates performances in tango clubs, with Duvall favouring observational scenes of social dancing over large staged production numbers.

=== Other ===
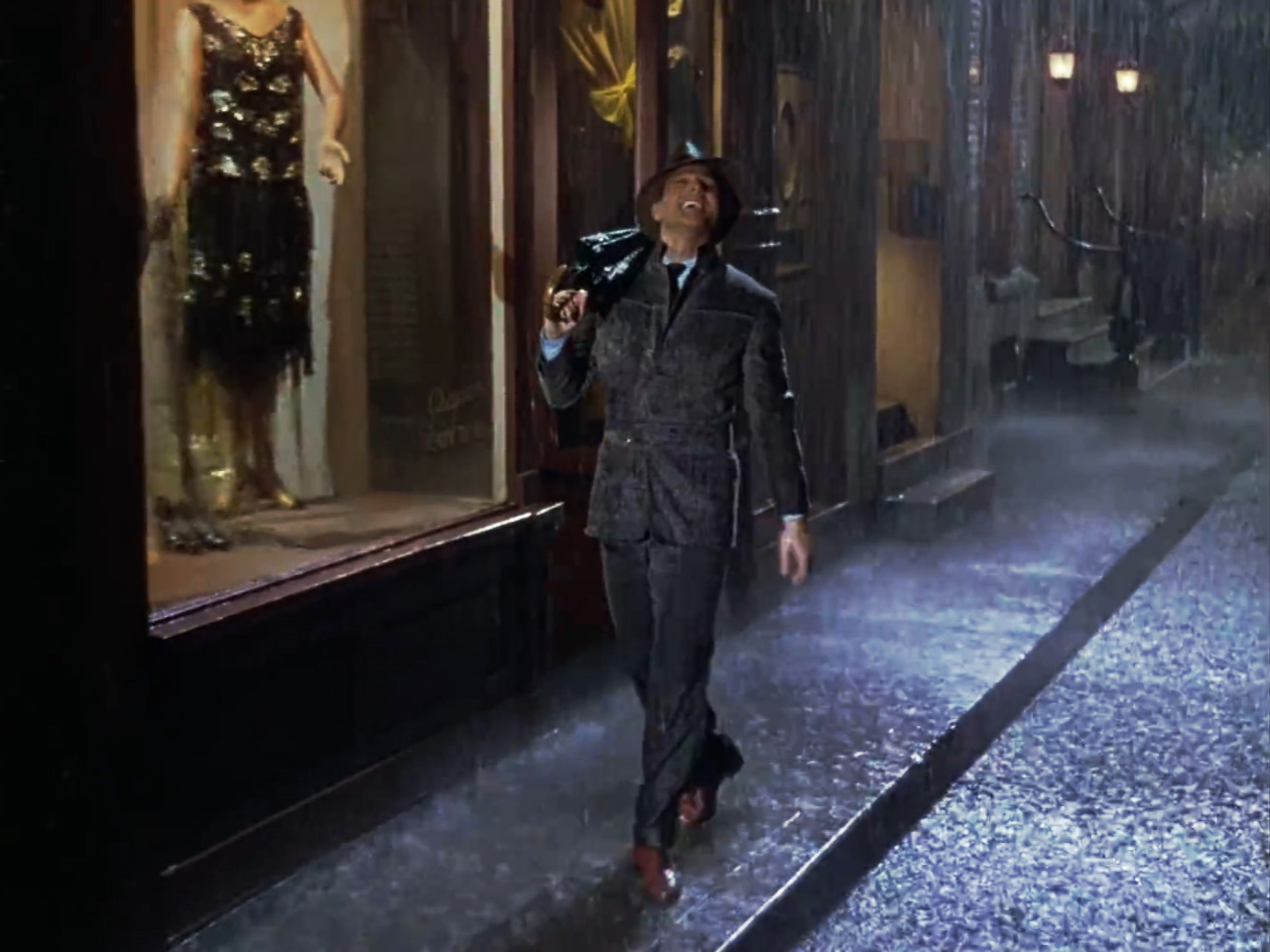
Gene Kelly in Singin' In The Rain

- Shall We Dance (1937) – The Fred Astaire and Ginger Rogers musical features the roller-skating duet "Let's Call the Whole Thing Off". Hermes Pan assisted Astaire with the film's dance numbers, while Harry Losee worked on the ballet sequences.
- Singin' in the Rain (1952) – Directed by Gene Kelly and Stanley Donen, the musical incorporates choreography into its depiction of Hollywood's transition to sound films. Sequences include Kelly's rain-soaked title solo and the extended "Broadway Ballet" featuring Cyd Charisse.
- Oh... Rosalinda!! (1955) – Directed by Michael Powell and Emeric Pressburger, the musical reimagines Johann Strauss II's operetta Die Fledermaus in post-war Vienna. Featuring Ludmilla Tchérina as Rosalinda, the film includes ballroom dancing choreographed by Alfred Rodrigues.
- The King and I (1956) – Starring Yul Brynner and Deborah Kerr, the musical includes the partnered dance "Shall We Dance". Jerome Robbins recreated his choreography from the original stage production for the film.
- Funny Face (1957) – Directed by Stanley Donen and starring Fred Astaire and Audrey Hepburn, the musical features Hepburn's solo dance in a Paris café, developed with contributions from Astaire, Donen and choreographer Eugene Loring.
- Luna de Miel (1959) – Directed by Michael Powell and starring Ludmilla Tchérina, the film incorporates two filmed ballets: El amor brujo by Manuel de Falla, featuring flamenco dancer Antonio, and The Lovers of Teruel, featuring Léonide Massine.
- The Rocky Horror Picture Show (1975) – Directed by Jim Sharman, the musical features the ensemble dance "The Time Warp", whose lyrics describe its movements. The number became a central part of audience participation at the film's midnight screenings.
- Saturday Night Fever (1977) – Directed by John Badham and starring John Travolta as Tony Manero, the film follows a Brooklyn dancer whose performances at a local discotheque culminate in a partnered hustle competition with Stephanie (Karen Lynn Gorney).
- All That Jazz (1979) – Directed and choreographed by Bob Fosse, the semi-autobiographical musical follows theatre director and choreographer Joe Gideon (Roy Scheider) through auditions, rehearsals and the staging of a Broadway production. The film's "Take Off with Us" sequence depicts choreography being developed and presented to producers.
- Footloose (1984) – Directed by Herbert Ross and starring Kevin Bacon as Ren McCormack, the musical drama follows a teenager challenging a small town's ban on dancing. Dance becomes central to the conflict between the town's young people and its conservative authorities.
- Dirty Dancing (1987) – Directed by Emile Ardolino and starring Jennifer Grey and Patrick Swayze, the romantic drama follows a young woman learning partnered dancing from a resort instructor in 1963. The film contrasts formal ballroom styles with the staff's social dancing, featuring choreography by Kenny Ortega.
- Tap (1989) – Directed by Nick Castle, the film stars Gregory Hines alongside Sammy Davis Jr., Savion Glover and veteran tap dancers including Harold Nicholas, Sandman Sims and Jimmy Slyde. A challenge sequence brings together different generations of tap performers, with much of the dancing improvised.
- Sing (1989) – Directed by Richard Baskin, the musical drama follows Brooklyn high-school students preparing a final stage competition before their school closes. Choreographers John Carrafa and Otis Sallid developed the film's dance sequences, with Carrafa staging movement-driven narrative scenes and Sallid handling the performance numbers.
- Flamenco (1995) – Directed by Carlos Saura and filmed by cinematographer Vittorio Storaro, the documentary presents flamenco performances spanning traditional and contemporary styles. Featuring artists including Paco de Lucía, Manolo Sanlúcar and Joaquín Cortés, the film uses a staged setting and changing light to frame its music and dance.
- The King Is Dancing (2000) – Directed by Gérard Corbiau, the historical drama depicts Louis XIV using court ballet to establish his public image and political authority. Composer Jean-Baptiste Lully and playwright Molière create staged ballets featuring the young king. The film’s court dances were choreographed by Béatrice Massin.
- Dirty Dancing: Havana Nights (2004) – Directed by Guy Ferland and starring Romola Garai and Diego Luna, the romantic dance drama is set in Havana shortly before the Cuban Revolution. The story draws on the experiences of choreographer JoAnn Jansen, who trained the principal actors for ten weeks and developed dance sequences combining partnered movement and Cuban social dance.
- Pina (2011) – Directed by Wim Wenders, the 3D documentary pays tribute to German choreographer Pina Bausch through performances by Tanztheater Wuppertal Pina Bausch. The film presents excerpts from works including The Rite of Spring, Café Müller, Kontakthof and Vollmond, using three-dimensional cinematography and location-based performances to translate Bausch's dance theatre to the screen.
- I'll Take My Chances (2011) – Directed by Desmond Elliot and starring Ini Edo, the Nigerian dance drama follows a young woman whose dancing is linked to traditional spiritual beliefs, bringing her into conflict with religious and social expectations. The film incorporates traditional dance performances, including a climactic competition sequence.
- Frances Ha (2012) – Directed by Noah Baumbach and starring Greta Gerwig as an aspiring New York dancer, the film follows her attempts to establish a career and personal independence. Dance appears in a tracking-shot sequence set to David Bowie's "Modern Love" and in a concluding ensemble performance choreographed by Frances, linking her development as a character to her work as a dancer.
- Magic Mike (2012) – Directed by Steven Soderbergh and starring Channing Tatum, the drama follows an experienced male stripper who mentors a younger performer at a Tampa nightclub. The film's stage routines combine synchronized ensemble dancing, themed costumes and individual performances, portraying dance as both entertainment and professional labour.
- Pop In Q (2016) – Directed by Naoki Miyahara, the Japanese animated fantasy follows five girls who must learn to dance together to save a world where time is collapsing. The film features computer-animated dance sequences, including an opening number performed by the five main characters.
- Climax (2018) – Directed by Gaspar Noé, the psychological horror film follows a French dance troupe whose rehearsal celebration descends into chaos. Choreographer Nina McNeely developed an extended, single-take ensemble dance incorporating voguing, waacking and krumping. The sequence uses coordinated camera movement and individual performances to establish the dancers' contrasting styles and group dynamics.

== List of films with memorable dance scenes ==
- The Four Horsemen of the Apocalypse (1921) – Directed by Rex Ingram, the silent film features Rudolph Valentino performing a tango in a Buenos Aires bar, a sequence that contributed to his rise to film stardom.
- After Seben (1929) – A short film featuring George "Shorty" Snowden and other Savoy Ballroom dancers performing early Lindy Hop and breakaway steps, accompanied by Chick Webb's band.
- Flying Down to Rio (1933) – The "Carioca" sequence features Fred Astaire and Ginger Rogers performing the Carioca, with choreography developed in part by Hermes Pan.
- A Day at the Races (1937) – The "All God's Chillun Got Rhythm" sequence features Whitey's Lindy Hoppers performing the Lindy Hop, in a dance number separate from the film's principal storyline.
- Keep Punching (1939) – The film features a Big Apple ensemble dance performed by Whitey's Lindy Hoppers, with choreography by Frankie Manning.
- Hot Chocolate (also titled Cottontail) (1941) – A Soundie featuring Whitey's Lindy Hoppers, including Frankie Manning, Norma Miller and Al Minns, dancing to music performed by Duke Ellington and his orchestra. Its cuts and fades generally follow the music's beat, linking the editing to the jazz performance.
- Hellzapoppin' (1941) – The film features an acrobatic Lindy Hop sequence performed by Whitey's Lindy Hoppers and choreographed by Frankie Manning, incorporating aerials and synchronized ensemble dancing.
- Stormy Weather (1943) – The Nicholas Brothers, Fayard and Harold Nicholas, perform the acrobatic tap-dance sequence "Jumpin' Jive" with Cab Calloway's orchestra. The routine culminates in the brothers leapfrogging down a staircase and landing in splits on successive steps.
- Kiss Me Kate (1953) – The "From This Moment On" sequence features Ann Miller, Tommy Rall, Bob Fosse and Carol Haney, including a segment choreographed by Fosse for himself and Haney.
- Seven Brides for Seven Brothers (1954) – The barn-raising dance sequence, choreographed by Michael Kidd, combines ballet and acrobatics, with performers including Tommy Rall and Russ Tamblyn.
- My Sister Eileen (1955) – Bob Fosse and Tommy Rall perform a competitive dance in an alley, using acrobatic movements and synchronized footwork as their characters vie for Eileen's attention. Choreographed by Fosse, the film marked his first onscreen choreography credit.
- El bolero de Raquel (1957) – In this Mexican comedy, Cantinflas plays a shoeshiner who joins a nightclub dancer performing to Maurice Ravel's Boléro, turning the ballet-inspired performance into physical comedy. The title plays on the Spanish word bolero, which can also mean shoeshiner.
- Never on Sunday (1960) – Directed by Jules Dassin, the film features Melina Mercouri as Ilya, whose barefoot dancing and performances of Greek music form part of the film's portrayal of everyday life in Piraeus.
- West Side Story (1961) – The opening Prologue, choreographed by Jerome Robbins, establishes the rivalry between the Jets and Sharks through ensemble dance performed across New York City streets and playgrounds. The later "Cool" sequence uses tightly coordinated movement to express the Jets' grief, anger and tension following the rumble.
- Zorba the Greek (1964) – The final scene features Anthony Quinn and Alan Bates dancing on a beach in Crete to music by Mikis Theodorakis. The dance, known as Sirtaki, was choreographed for the film by Giorgos Provias.
- The Sound of Music (1965) – Julie Andrews and Christopher Plummer, as Maria and Captain von Trapp, perform a Ländler during a party. The dance was choreographed for the film by Marc Breaux and Dee Dee Wood, drawing on the traditional Austrian dance.
- Sweet Charity (1969) – Directed and choreographed by Bob Fosse, the musical features the stylized "Rich Man's Frug" dance sequence, highlighted alongside "Big Spender" in a contemporary Monthly Film Bulletin review.
- Saturday Night Fever (1977) – John Travolta, as Tony Manero, performs a solo disco dance to the Bee Gees' "You Should Be Dancing" on the dance floor of a Brooklyn nightclub. Travolta later explained that he selected the song for the solo because its faster rhythm suited the choreography.
- Flashdance (1983) – The climactic audition sequence, set to "Flashdance... What a Feeling", combines ballet, jazz dance, acrobatics and breaking. The sequence uses editing to integrate performances by Jennifer Beals, dance double Marine Jahan, gymnast Sharon Shapiro and breaking performer Crazy Legs.
- Pee-wee's Big Adventure (1985) – Paul Reubens, as Pee-wee Herman, performs a dance on top of a bar to "Tequila" by The Champs, wearing platform shoes to win over a group of hostile bikers. The sequence was discussed by film critic Pauline Kael in her contemporary review.
- Hairspray (1988 and 2007) – In John Waters's 1988 film, Tracy Turnblad leads the ensemble in the dance "The Bug" during the finale. The 2007 musical adaptation, directed and choreographed by Adam Shankman, features ensemble numbers including "You Can't Stop the Beat", drawing on late-1950s and early-1960s social dance styles.
- Earth Girls Are Easy (1988) – At the Deca Dance nightclub, the alien Zeebo (Damon Wayans) imitates another dancer's movements before winning a dance contest, in a sequence combining dance and physical comedy.
- Scent of a Woman (1992) – Al Pacino, portraying the blind retired officer Frank Slade, dances a tango with Gabrielle Anwar in a New York hotel ballroom. The sequence was prepared with choreographers Jerry Mitchell and Paul Pellicoro.
- Addams Family Values (1993) – Raul Julia and Anjelica Huston, as Gomez and Morticia Addams, perform a theatrical tango together, incorporating exaggerated gestures and comic physicality.
- Pulp Fiction (1994) – John Travolta and Uma Thurman, as Vincent Vega and Mia Wallace, enter a twist contest at Jack Rabbit Slim's restaurant, dancing to Chuck Berry's "You Never Can Tell". The sequence uses dance to develop the characters' relationship without dialogue.
- Train of Life (1998) – The film includes a scene in which Jewish and Romani musicians and dancers, fleeing Nazi persecution, engage in a musical and dance exchange. Ethnomusicologist Carol Silverman discusses the sequence as an imagined connection between the two communities.
- A Knight's Tale (2001) – At a courtly gathering, William (Heath Ledger) invents a dance supposedly from Gelderland. The formal medieval-style routine develops into a group dance set to David Bowie's "Golden Years", blending period setting with contemporary music.
- Chicago (2002) – The "Cell Block Tango" sequence, staged by director and choreographer Rob Marshall, presents the accounts of six women imprisoned for murder as a stylized musical performance within Roxie Hart's imagination.
- Napoleon Dynamite (2004) – Jon Heder's character performs a solo dance to Jamiroquai's "Canned Heat" at a school assembly to support Pedro's campaign for class president. Heder improvised the movements, and the finished sequence was assembled from several takes.
- The Secret of the Grain (2007) – In the film's extended climax, Rym (Hafsia Herzi) performs a belly dance to distract diners at her stepfather's restaurant while the missing couscous is sought. Critics have discussed the dance's role in the film's suspense and its portrayal of cultural expectations.
- (500) Days of Summer (2009) – After spending the night with Summer, Tom (Joseph Gordon-Levitt) imagines a celebratory dance through downtown Los Angeles to Hall & Oates' "You Make My Dreams", joined by pedestrians and an animated bird. The sequence expresses his elation through a musical-fantasy interlude.
- Toy Story 3 (2010) – During the closing credits, Buzz Lightyear and Jessie perform a paso doble-inspired dance to the Gipsy Kings' Spanish-language version of "You've Got a Friend in Me". Film scholar Susan Smith interprets the number as a celebration of the toys' relationships and independence.
- Ex Machina (2014) – Nathan (Oscar Isaac) and Kyoko (Sonoya Mizuno) perform a synchronized disco dance to Oliver Cheatham's "Get Down Saturday Night". Choreographed by Arthur Pita, the unexpected sequence contrasts the film's otherwise restrained atmosphere with coordinated movement by a human and an android.
- The Greatest Showman (2017) – The opening number, "The Greatest Show", features Hugh Jackman as P. T. Barnum performing with the circus ensemble, incorporating group choreography and circus acts. Film critic Mike Schulz highlighted the synchronized movements and the use of full-body framing to present the choreography on screen.
- Roald Dahl's Matilda the Musical (2022) – The "Revolting Children" ensemble dance sequence, choreographed by Ellen Kane, features students performing through the school corridors. The number attracted widespread online attention, particularly for the performance of Meesha Garbett.
- Lyle, Lyle, Crocodile (2022) – The musical number "Take a Look at Us Now" features Javier Bardem performing alongside the animated crocodile Lyle. Choreographer Shannon Holtzapffel developed the movement and interactions between the live-action performers and Lyle. The number was included in Vanity Fair's selection of the best musical movie moments of 2022.
- RRR (2022) – The musical sequence "Naatu Naatu", directed by S. S. Rajamouli and choreographed by Prem Rakshith, features N. T. Rama Rao Jr. and Ram Charan performing synchronized dance steps at a colonial-era gathering. Their performance develops into a dance competition against British guests, using movement to express friendship and resistance to colonial prejudice. Rakshith developed the contrasting performers' movements around their individual styles, with particular emphasis on synchronized footwork.
- Poor Things (2023) – In a Lisbon ballroom, Bella Baxter (Emma Stone) dances with Duncan Wedderburn (Mark Ruffalo) using unconventional movements that contrast with the formal dancing around them. Choreographer Constanza Macras developed the sequence around Bella’s character, with the dance reflecting her growing independence.
- Sinners (2025) – During Sammie’s (Miles Caton) performance of "I Lied to You" at a Mississippi juke joint, dancers and musicians representing different periods of Black cultural history appear together, including West African dance and Memphis jookin. Choreographer Aakomon Jones coordinated the different styles for a sequence staged with moving-camera shots and visual effects.

== See also ==
- Dance on television
