= So You Think You Can Dance (American TV series) season 6 =

So You Think You Can Dance
- Season 6
- Hosted by: Cat Deeley
- Judges: Nigel Lythgoe; Mary Murphy; Adam Shankman
- Winner: Russell Ferguson
- Runner-up: Jakob Karr

Release
- Original network: Fox
- Original release: September 9 – December 16, 2009

Season chronology
- ← Previous; Season 5 Next → Season 7

So You Think You Can Dance, also known as SYTYCD, is a United States television reality program and dance competition airing on the Fox Broadcasting Company network. Season six premiered on Wednesday, September 9, 2009, with Nigel Lythgoe and Mary Murphy returning as permanent judges and Cat Deeley returning to host. Season six is the show's only season to air during the fall season, immediately following the summer airing of season five. Live shows began airing October 26 and the season finale aired on December 16. Russell Ferguson, the first krump contestant to make it to the Las Vegas auditions, won the title of "America's Favorite Dancer" in first place and the $250,000 prize. Also in the finale were Jakob Karr in second place, Kathryn McCormick in third place, Ellenore Scott in fourth place, Ashleigh Di Lello in fifth place and Ryan Di Lello in sixth place.

This season is also noteworthy for featuring Ariana DeBose who, despite being amongst the first contestants eliminated, would later go on to win the Academy Award for Best Supporting Actress for her performance as Anita in the Steven Spielberg remake of West Side Story.

== Auditions ==
=== Locations ===
Open auditions for this season somewhat overlapped season 5. These auditions for season 6 were held in the following cities after season 5's Las Vegas week, but before season 5's finals started:

Audition	City	Date	Judges
Colonial Theatre	Boston, Massachusetts	May 28, 2009	Nigel, Mary, Tyce Diorio
Woodruff Arts Center	Atlanta, Georgia	June 1, 2009	Nigel, Mary, Lil' C
The Orpheum Theatre	Los Angeles, California	June 12, 2009	Nigel, Mary, Adam Shankman
New Orleans Morial Convention Center	New Orleans, Louisiana	June 19, 2009	Adam Shankman, Mary, Lil C ^{1}
Phoenix Convention Center	Phoenix, Arizona	June 26, 2009	Nigel, Mary, Mia Michaels
Rose Wagner Performing Arts Center	Salt Lake City, Utah	July 24, 2009	Nigel, Mary, Mia Michaels

^1Lythgoe was accepting an honorary degree from the University of Bedfordshire; therefore, two guest judges were present.

== Las Vegas week ==
Judges: Nigel Lythgoe, Mary Murphy, Adam Shankman, Mia Michaels, Tyce Diorio, Debbie Allen

The Las Vegas callbacks were held at Planet Hollywood Resort and Casino in Las Vegas, Nevada. 152 contestants were invited to participate in the callback auditions. This number was cut to 38 contestants, before the announcement of the season's top 20 contestants. Las Vegas week included the following rounds, with cuts made after each:

Contestant(s)	Task/style	Music	Choreographer(s)
All (individual)	Solo	Music chosen by contestant	The contestant
All	Hip-Hop	"Girls on the Dance Floor"—Far East Movement	Tabitha and Napoleon D'umo
All	Cha-Cha	"Disturbia (Jody den Broeder remix)"—Rihanna	Louis van Amstel Anya Garnis (assisting)
All	Jazz	"Green Light"—John Legend	Laurie Ann Gibson
All (in groups)	Group choreography	CD with track picked from a hat	The group
All	Contemporary	"Walking on Air"—Kerli	Mia Michaels
Female contestants	Broadway	"There's Gotta Be Something Better Than This" from Sweet Charity	Tyce Diorio
Male contestants	Broadway	"It's Still Rock and Roll to Me"—Billy Joel	Tyce Diorio
All (individual)	Solo	Music chosen by contestant	The contestant

== Top 20 Contestants ==
=== Female Contestants ===
Contestant	Age	Home Town	Dance Style	Elimination date	Placement
Kathryn McCormick	18	Augusta, Georgia	Contemporary	December 16, 2009	3rd Place
Ellenore Scott	18	San Diego, California	Jazz	December 16, 2009	4th Place
Ashleigh Di Lello	26	Orem, Utah	Latin Ballroom	December 16, 2009	5th Place
Mollee Gray	18	Orem, Utah	Jazz	December 9, 2009	Top 8
Noelle Marsh	18	Raleigh, North Carolina	Contemporary	December 2, 2009	Top 10
Karen Hauer	27	Holmdel, New Jersey (originally from Venezuela)	Latin Ballroom	November 25, 2009	Top 12
Channing Cooke	18	Haverhill, Massachusetts	Contemporary	November 18, 2009	Top 14
Pauline Mata	19	Malibu, California (originally from Philippines)	Jazz	November 11, 2009	Top 16
Bianca Revels	20	Detroit, Michigan	Tap	November 3, 2009	Top 18
Ariana DeBose	18	Raleigh, North Carolina	Contemporary	October 27, 2009	Top 20

=== Male Contestants ===
Contestant	Age	Home Town	Dance Style	Elimination date	Placement
Russell Ferguson	19	Boston, Massachusetts	Krump	December 16, 2009	Winner
Jakob Karr	18 → 19	Orlando, Florida	Contemporary	December 16, 2009	Runner Up
Ryan Di Lello	28	Orem, Utah	Latin Ballroom	December 16, 2009	6th Place
Jonathan "Legacy" Perez	28	Miami, Florida	Breakdance	December 9, 2009	Top 8
Nathan Trasoras	18	Fresno, California	Contemporary	December 2, 2009	Top 10
Victor Smalley	21	Miami, Florida	Contemporary	November 25, 2009	Top 12
Kevin Hunte	23	Brooklyn, New York	Hip Hop	November 18, 2009	Top 14
Peter Sabasino	22	Philadelphia, Pennsylvania	Tap	November 11, 2009	Top 16
Phillip Attmore	25	Pasadena, California	Tap	November 3, 2009	Top 18
Brandon Dumlao^{2}	21	Sacramento, California	Hip Hop	October 27, 2009	Top 20

^2 Dumlao replaced original Top 20 contestant William "Billy" Bell, who had to withdraw from the competition due to illness.

== Studio Shows ==
=== Elimination chart ===
The elimination song for the women playing during the montage was "Never Say Never" by The Fray. The elimination song for the men playing during the montage was "Where It Ends" by 16 Frames.

Legend
Female	Male	Bottom 3 couples	Bottom 4 contestants

Result show date:	10/27^{3}	11/03^{3}	11/11	11/18	11/25	12/02	12/09	12/16
Contestant	Results							
Russell Ferguson	Btm 4							Winner
Jakob Karr								Runner-Up
Kathryn McCormick						Btm 4		3rd place
Ellenore Scott			Btm 3		Btm 3		Btm 4	4th place
Ashleigh Di Lello							Injury^{4}	5th place
Ryan Di Lello			Btm 3		Btm 3	Btm 4	Btm 4	6th place
Jonathan "Legacy" Perez							Elim	
Mollee Gray				Btm 3	Btm 3		Elim	
Nathan Trasoras				Btm 3	Btm 3	Elim		
Noelle Marsh	Injury^{4}	Btm 4				Elim		
Victor Smalley		Btm 4		Btm 3	Elim			
Karen Hauer			Btm 3	Btm 3	Elim			
Kevin Hunte			Btm 3	Elim				
Channing Cooke				Elim				
Peter Sabasino			Elim					
Pauline Mata	Btm 4		Elim					
Phillip Attmore		Elim						
Bianca Revels		Elim						
Brandon Dumlao	Elim							
Ariana DeBose	Elim							

^3The show was unable to schedule full performance and results shows for the first two weeks due to conflicts with the World Series.
^4 These female contestants were barred from performing their routines. See below for more information.

=== Performance nights ===
Due to network conflicts with the World Series, the show was unable to schedule a separate results show for the first two weeks. As a result, no public voting was held on those occasions; after the couples' performances, the judges alone selected four contestants to perform solos, and subsequently eliminated two.

The standard format of a performance show followed by voting, with a results show the following night, resumed for the third week of competition.

==== Week 1 (October 26, 2009) ====
===== "Meet the Top 20" =====
- Performances:

Contestants	Style	Music	Choreographer(s)
Top 20	Jazz	"Comanche"—The Revels	Wade Robson; Amanda Robson (co-conceived)
Russell Ferguson; Kevin Hunte; Jonathan "Legacy" Perez	Hip-Hop	"Beggin' (District 78 mix)"—Madcon	Tabitha and Napoleon D'umo
Channing Cooke; Ariana DeBose; Jakob Karr; Nathan Trasoras	Contemporary	"Crying"—k.d. lang	Tyce Diorio
Phillip Attmore; Bianca Revels; Peter Sabasino	Tap	"Take the "A" Train"—Ella Fitzgerald	Derick K. Grant
Mollee Gray; Pauline Mata; Ellenore Scott	Jazz	"On a Cloud"—Platinum Pied Pipers	Sonya Tayeh
Kathryn McCormick; Noelle Marsh; Billy Bell; Victor Smalley	Contemporary	"Viva La Vida"—Coldplay	Mandy Moore
Karen Hauer; Ashleigh Di Lello; Ryan Di Lello	Samba	"Everything I Can't Have"—Robin Thicke	Jason Gilkison

===== Performance show =====
- Top 20 Couple dances:

Couple	Style	Music	Choreographer(s)	Results
Channing Cooke; Phillip Attmore	Jive	"Rockin' Robin"—The Jackson 5	Jason Gilkison	Safe
Ashleigh Di Lello; Jakob Karr	Broadway	"Hit Me With a Hot Note (And Watch Me Bounce)" from Sophisticated Ladies	Tyce Diorio	Safe
Ariana DeBose; Peter Sabasino	Hip-Hop	"Black and Gold"—Sam Sparro	Tabitha and Napoleon D'umo	DeBose Eliminated
Melanie LaPatin^{5} Russell Ferguson	Foxtrot	"Vagabond Shoes"—Vic Damone	Tony Meredith; Melanie LaPatin	Ferguson in bottom 4
Bianca Revels; Victor Smalley	Contemporary	"Wasted Time"—Me'shell Ndegeocello	Travis Wall (season 2)	Safe
Karen Hauer; Kevin Hunt	Cha-Cha	"Push It" from Glee	Tony Meredith; Melanie LaPatin	Safe
Ellenore Scott; Ryan Di Lello	Contemporary Jazz	"Arcadia"—Apparat	Sonya Tayeh	Safe
Brandon Dumlao; Pauline Mata	Smooth Waltz	"You Light Up My Life"—Whitney Houston	Jason Gilkison	Mata in bottom 4 Dumlao eliminated
Kathryn McCormick; Jonathan "Legacy" Perez	Hip-Hop	"On & On"—Missy Elliott	Dave Scott	Safe
Mollee Grey; Nathan Trasoras	Disco	"Turn the Beat Around" (Pablo's 12" Remix)—Gloria Estefan	Doriana Sanchez	Safe

^5Noelle Marsh did not perform on the show due to injury. She would become Ferguson's partner in Week 2.

- Bottom 4 contestant's solos:

Contestant	Style	Music	Result
Ariana DeBose	Contemporary	"Darkest Hour"—Charlotte Martin	Eliminated
Russell Ferguson	Krump	"Give the Drummer Sum"—Black Milk	Safe
Pauline Mata	Jazz	"Magalenha"—Sérgio Mendes	Safe
Brandon Dumlao	Hip-Hop	"Slow Dancing in a Burning Room"—John Mayer	Eliminated

- Eliminated:
  - Ariana DeBose
  - Brandon Dumlao
- New Pairs:
  - Pauline Mata and Peter Sabasino

==== Week 2 (November 3, 2009) ====
- Top 18 Couple dances:

Couple	Style	Music	Choreographer(s)	Results
Noelle Marsh; Russell Ferguson	Hip-Hop	"Move Shake Drop Remix"—DJ Laz, Flo Rida and Casley	Jamal Sims	Marsh in bottom 4
Ashleigh Di Lello; Jakob Karr	Viennese Waltz	"At Last"—Etta James	Tony Meredith; Melanie LaPatin	Safe
Bianca Revels; Victor Smalley	Broadway	"Maybe God Is Tryin' To Tell You Something" from The Color Purple	Tyce Diorio	Revels eliminated Smalley in bottom 4
Mollee Gray; Nathan Trasoras	Bollywood	"Azeem O Shaan Shahenshah" from Jodhaa Akbar	Nakul Dev Mahajan	Safe
Channing Cooke; Phillip Attmore	Samba	"Maracatu Funk"—The Samba Squad	Tony Meredith; Melanie LaPatin	Attmore eliminated
Karen Hauer; Kevin Hunte	Hip-Hop	"Ice Cream Paint Job"—Dorrough	Tabitha and Napoleon D'umo	Safe
Kathryn McCormick; Jonathan "Legacy" Perez	Contemporary	"2 Steps Away"—Patti LaBelle	Stacey Tookey	Safe
Pauline Mata; Peter Sabasino	Jazz	"Little Green Bag"—George Baker Selection	Wade Robson	Safe
Ellenore Scott; Ryan Di Lello	Argentine Tango	"Violentango"—Ástor Piazzolla	Miriam Larici; Leonardo Barrionuevo	Safe

- Bottom 4 contestant's solos:

Dancer	Style	Music	Result
Noelle Marsh	Contemporary	"For a Reason"—Zhané	Safe
Victor Smalley	Contemporary	"Narvas" from The Matrix: Revolutions	Safe
Bianca Revels	Tap	"Tootsee Roll"—69 Boyz	Eliminated
Phillip Attmore	Tap	"Almost Like Being in Love"—Nat King Cole	Eliminated

- Eliminated:
  - Bianca Revels
  - Phillip Atmore
- New pairs:
  - Channing Cooke and Victor Smalley

==== Week 3 (November 10, 2009) ====
- Top 16 Couple dances:

Couple	Style	Music	Choreographer(s)	Results
Karen Hauer; Kevin Hunte	Hustle	"Come To Me"—France Joli	Maria Torres	Bottom 3
Ashleigh Di Lello; Jakob Karr	Jazz	"Relax"—Frankie Goes to Hollywood	Mandy Moore	Safe
Pauline Mata; Peter Sabasino	Quickstep	"Hey Baby! (Shake Those Hula Hips)"—Big Kahuna & The Copa Cat Pack	JT Thomas; Tomas Mielnicki	Both eliminated
Kathryn McCormick; Jonathan "Legacy" Perez	Broadway	"I Wan'na Be Like You (The Monkey Song)"—Swingin' Fireballs	Andy Blankenbuehler	Safe
Channing Cooke; Victor Smalley	Contemporary	"Be Be Your Love" (Live at KRCW)—Rachael Yamagata	Stacey Tookey	Safe
Ellenore Scott; Ryan Di Lello	Hip-Hop (Krump)	"Lost Boiz Anthem"—Tha J-Squad	Lil' C	Bottom 3
Mollee Gray; Nathan Trasoras	Salsa	"Quimbara"—Celia Cruz and Johnny Pacheco	Gustavo Vargas	Safe
Noelle Marsh; Russell Ferguson	African Jazz	"Frog Dance"—Mickey Hart and Planet Drum	Sean Cheesman	Safe

==== Week 4 (November 17, 2009) ====
- Top 14 Couple dances:

Couple	Style	Music	Choreographer(s)	Results
Ashleigh Di Lello; Jakob Karr	Lyrical Hip-Hop	"Whatcha Say"—Jason Derülo	Tabitha and Napoleon D'umo	Safe
Karen Hauer; Kevin Hunte	Broadway	"If My Friends Could See Me Now" from Sweet Charity	Spencer Liff	Hunte eliminated
Noelle Marsh; Russell Ferguson	Foxtrot	"Baby (You've Got What It Takes)"—Michael Bublé and Sharon Jones & The Dap-Kings	Edward Simon	Safe
Channing Cooke; Victor Smalley	Jazz	"Blackbird"—Bobby McFerrin	Tyce Diorio	Cooke eliminated
Kathryn McCormick; Jonathan "Legacy" Perez	Paso Doble	"Pursuit" from Cirque du Soleil	Tony Meredith	Safe
Ellenore Scott; Ryan Di Lello	Contemporary	"Your Ex-Lover Is Dead"—Stars	Travis Wall (season 2)	Safe
Mollee Gray; Nathan Trasoras	Pop-Jazz	"Bad Romance"—Lady Gaga	Laurie Ann Gibson	Bottom 3

==== Week 5 (November 24, 2009) ====
- Top 12 Couple dances:

Couple	Style	Music	Choreographer(s)	Results
Ellenore Scott; Ryan Di Lello	Lindy Hop	"I've Got To Be a Rug Cutter"—The Boilermaker Jazz Band	Carla Heiney	Bottom 3
Ellenore Scott; Ryan Di Lello	Broadway	"Razzle Dazzle" from Chicago	Spencer Liff	Bottom 3
Kathryn McCormick; Jonathan "Legacy" Perez	Jazz	"So Deep"—Hot Chip	Sonya Tayeh	Safe
Kathryn McCormick; Jonathan "Legacy" Perez	Viennese Waltz	"Your Guardian Angel"—The Red Jumpsuit Apparatus	Jean-Marc Généreux; France Mousseau	Safe
Karen Hauer; Victor Smalley	Tango	"Montserrat"—Orquesta del Plata	Tony Meredith; Melanie LaPatin	Both eliminated
Karen Hauer; Victor Smalley	Hip-Hop	"Moving Mountains"—Usher	Laurie Ann Gibson	Both eliminated
Mollee Gray; Nathan Trasoras	Hip-Hop	"Ring-a-Ling"—The Black Eyed Peas	Jamal Sims	Bottom 3
Mollee Gray; Nathan Trasoras	Can-Can	"Cancan Suite" —Offenbach/Ponchielli	Tyce DiOrio	Bottom 3
Noelle Marsh; Russell Ferguson	Samba	"Hips Don't Lie"—Shakira	Tony Meredith; Melanie LaPatin	Safe
Noelle Marsh; Russell Ferguson	Contemporary	"A Case of You"—Diana Krall	Tyce DiOrio	Safe
Ashleigh Di Lello; Jakob Karr	Lyrical Jazz	"Time Flies"—Lykke Li	Sonya Tayeh	Safe
Ashleigh Di Lello; Jakob Karr	Cha-Cha	"Cha Cha Heels" (Ralphi Rosario Radio Edit)— Rosabel feat. Jeanie Tracy	Jean-Marc Généreux; France Mousseau	Safe

==== Week 6 (December 1, 2009) ====
- Top 10 Couple dances:

Couple	Style	Music	Choreographer(s)	Results
Noelle Marsh; Ryan Di Lello	Hip-Hop	"Give It to Me Right"—Melanie Fiona	Tabitha and Napoleon D'umo	Marsh eliminated Di Lello in bottom 4
Noelle Marsh; Ryan Di Lello	Smooth Waltz	"Jeux d'Eau"—Cirque du Soleil	JT Thomas; Tomas Mielnicki	Marsh eliminated Di Lello in bottom 4
Ashleigh Di Lello; Jonathan "Legacy" Perez	Contemporary	"Poison"—The Prodigy	Garry Stewart	Safe
Ashleigh Di Lello; Jonathan "Legacy" Perez	Hip-Hop	"Slow Down"—Bobby Valentino	Dave Scott	Safe
Kathryn McCormick; Nathan Trasoras	Broadway	"Choreography"—Danny Kaye	Spencer Liff	McCormick in bottom 4 Trasoras eliminated
Kathryn McCormick; Nathan Trasoras	Rumba	"Walk On By"—Aretha Franklin	Tony Meredith; Melanie LaPatin	McCormick in bottom 4 Trasoras eliminated
Ellenore Scott; Jakob Karr	Quickstep	"Four Brothers"—The Manhattan Transfer	Tony Meredith; Melanie LaPatin	Safe
Ellenore Scott; Jakob Karr	Contemporary	"Tore My Heart"—OONA and Dave Tweedie	Sonya Tayeh	Safe
Mollee Gray; Russell Ferguson	Lyrical Jazz	"It Must Have Been Love"—Roxette	Mandy Moore	Safe
Mollee Gray; Russell Ferguson	Jive	"Land of 1000 Dances"—Jimmy Barnes	Anya Garnis; Pasha Kovalev (season 3)	Safe

- Top 10 contestant's solos:

Contestant	Style	Music	Result
Mollee Gray	Jazz	"Rock the Beat"—LMFAO	Safe
Russell Ferguson	Krump	"Outros"—Black Milk	Safe
Noelle Marsh	Contemporary	"Every Time It Rains"—Charlotte Martin	Eliminated
Ryan Di Lello	Paso Doble	"Rock You Like a Hurricane"—Scorpions	Bottom 4
Kathryn McCormick	Contemporary	"Beautiful"—Bethany Dillon	Bottom 4
Nathan Trasoras	Contemporary	"Golden Train"—Justin Nozuka	Eliminated
Ellenore Scott	Jazz	"Beatbox Harmonica"—Yuri Lane	Safe
Jonathan "Legacy" Perez	Breakdancing	"No Air"—Jordin Sparks & Chris Brown	Safe
Ashleigh Di Lello	Samba	"Batucada Por Favor"—Bob Azzam	Safe
Jakob Karr	Contemporary	"Always Midnight" (Acoustic)—Pat Monahan	Safe

==== Week 7 (December 8, 2009) ====
- Top 8 Couple dances:

Couple	Style	Music	Choreographer(s)	Results
Kathryn McCormick; Ryan Di Lello	Disco	"Last Dance" (Samantha Ronson remix)—Donna Summer	Doriana Sanchez	Di Lello in bottom 4
Kathryn McCormick; Ryan Di Lello	Cha-Cha	"Put Your Hands On Me"—Joss Stone	Jason Gilkison	Di Lello in bottom 4
Mollee Gray; Jakob Karr	Viennese Waltz	"Ordinary Day"—Vanessa Carlton	Jason Gilkison	Gray eliminated
Mollee Gray; Jakob Karr	Broadway	"Easy Street" (Samantha Ronson remix) from Annie	Joey Dowling	Gray eliminated
Ellenore Scott; Jonathan "Legacy" Perez	Contemporary	"Machine Gun"—Portishead	Travis Wall (season 2)	Scott in bottom 4 Perez eliminated
Ellenore Scott; Jonathan "Legacy" Perez	Hip-Hop	"People Are Strange" (District 78 remix)—The Doors	Tabitha and Napoleon D'umo	Scott in bottom 4 Perez eliminated
Russell Ferguson; Rachel/Alysha^{6}	Hip-Hop	"Too Much Booty 2" (Bobby J Remix)—Soundmaster T & Jah-Rista feat. Korveil	Shane Sparks	Safe
Russell Ferguson; Rachel/Alysha^{6}	Bollywood	"Spirit of Rangeela" from Rangeela	Nakul Dev Mahajan	Safe

- Top 8 contestant's solos:^{6}

Contestant	Style	Music	Result
Jakob Karr	Contemporary	"When You Say My Name"—Mario Spinetti	Safe
Mollee Gray	Jazz	"Heartburn"—Alicia Keys	Eliminated
Jonathan "Legacy" Perez	Breakdance	"Fancy Footwork"—Chromeo	Eliminated
Ellenore Scott	Jazz	"I Got the Feelin'"—James Brown	Bottom 4
Russell Ferguson	Krump	"Holiday Buckness"—J-Squad	Safe
Kathryn McCormick	Contemporary	"Shadowfeet"—Brooke Fraser	Safe
Ryan Di Lello	Cha-Cha	"Din Da Da"—Kevin Aviance	Bottom 4

^6 Ashleigh Di Lello was paired with Russell Ferguson, but dislocated her shoulder during rehearsal of their Bollywood number and was barred from performing by doctors. As a result, she did not perform a solo and Ferguson danced their two numbers with the choreographers' assistants, Alysha Shroff. Voting for Di Lello was still opened; viewers were urged to consider her previous performances and rehearsal footage in making their choice in voting for her.

==== Week 8 (December 15, 2009) ====
- Top 6 Couple dances:

Couple	Style	Music	Choreographer(s)
Kathryn McCormick; Ryan Di Lello	Samba	"Magalenha"—Sérgio Mendes	Jason Gilkison
Ellenore Scott; Jakob Karr	Broadway	"I Gotcha" from Fosse	Tyce Diorio
Ashleigh Di Lello; Russell Ferguson	Lyrical Jazz	"Angel Standing By"—Jewel	Sonya Tayeh
Ellenore Scott; Ryan Di Lello	Jazz	"Kontact Me"—Boyz Noise	Garry Stewart
Ashleigh Di Lello; Jakob Karr	Foxtrot	"Let the Good Times Roll"—Chuck Brown & Eva Cassidy	Jean-Marc Généreux
Ellenore Scott; Russell Ferguson	Paso Doble	"Village Attack" from Blood Diamond	Jason Gilkison
Kathryn McCormick; Jakob Karr	Contemporary Ballet	"At This Moment"—Michael Bublé	Dwight Rhoden; Desmond Richardson
Ashleigh Di Lello; Ryan Di Lello	Contemporary	"I'm There Too"—Michelle Featherstone	Travis Wall (season 2)
Kathryn McCormick; Russell Ferguson	Hip-Hop	"I Can Transform Ya"—Chris Brown ft. Lil Wayne and Swizz Beats	Tabitha and Napoleon D'umo

=== Result shows ===
==== Week 3 (November 11, 2009) ====
- Group dance: Top 16: "Warrior, Pt. 2"—Lloyd Banks (Hip-Hop; Choreographer: Dave Scott)
- Guest dancers: Alvin Ailey American Dance Theater: "Episodes"—Ulysses Dove (Contemporary Ballet; Choreographer: Ulysses Dove)
- Bottom 3's solos:

Contestant	Style	Music	Result
Ellenore Scott	Jazz	"Eleanor"—Alexa Woodward	Safe
Ryan Di Lello	Jive	"Jump with My Baby"—Big Bad Voodoo Daddy	Safe
Pauline Mata	Jazz	"Took the Night"—Chelley	Eliminated
Peter Sabasino	Tap	None^{6}	Eliminated
Karen Hauer	Samba	"Celia y Tito"—Celia Cruz & Tito Puente	Safe
Kevin Hunte	Hip-Hop	"I Question Mark"—Wade Robson	Safe

^6 Sabasino chose to dance a cappella.

- Eliminated:
  - Pauline Mata
  - Peter Sabasino
- New Pairs:
  - None

==== Week 4 (November 18, 2009) ====
- Group dance: Top 14: "Aha!"—Imogen Heap (Contemporary Jazz; Choreographer: Wade Robson, co-conceived with Amanda Robson)
- Musical guest: "According to You"—Orianthi
- Guest dancers: Nakul Dev Mahajan and NDM Bollywood Dance Productions: "Desi Girl" from Dostana (Bollywood; Choreographer: Nakul Dev Mahajan)
- Bottom 3's solos:

Contestant	Style	Music	Result
Karen Hauer	Latin	"Break on Through (To the Other Side)"—The Doors	Safe
Kevin Hunte	Hip-Hop	"Freeze"—T-Pain featuring Chris Brown	Eliminated
Channing Cooke	Contemporary	"The Face"—RyanDan	Eliminated
Victor Smalley	Contemporary	"Baby's Romance"—Chris Garneau	Safe
Mollee Gray	Jazz	"Let Me Think About It (Radio Edit)"—Ida Corr vs. Fedde le Grand	Safe
Nathan Trasoras	Contemporary	"So Insane"—Discovery	Safe

- Eliminated:
  - Channing Cooke
  - Kevin Hunte
- New Pairs:
  - Karen Hauer and Victor Smalley

==== Week 5 (November 25, 2009) ====
- Group dance: Top 12: "What's a Girl Gotta Do"–Basement Jaxx feat. Paloma Faith (Pop-Jazz; Choreographer: Napoleon and Tabitha D'umo)
- Musical guest: "Give It Up To Me"–Shakira
- Guest dancer(s): Paloma Herrera: Don Quixote: Kitri's Variation (The Fan) - Ludwig Minkus (Ballet; Choreographer: Paloma Herrera)
- Bottom 3's solos:

Contestant	Style	Music	Result
Karen Hauer	Cha-Cha	"She Wants to Move" - N.E.R.D.	Eliminated
Victor Smalley	Contemporary	"Village Attack" from Blood Diamond	Eliminated
Mollee Gray	Jazz	"Bulletproof"—La Roux	Safe
Nathan Trasoras	Contemporary	"Going Going Gone (Live)"—Stars	Safe
Ellenore Scott	Jazz	"Bottom"–Zap Mama	Safe
Ryan Di Lello	Samba	"Baila Baila Conmigo"—Missiego	Safe

- Eliminated:
  - Karen Hauer
  - Victor Smalley
- New Pairs:
  - None. Now that only 10 contestants remain, pairs are randomly assigned each week and the top 10 will be voted individually.

==== Week 6 (December 2, 2009) ====
- Group dance: Top 10: "It's Still Rock and Roll to Me"—Billy Joel (Broadway; Choreographer: Tyce Diorio)
- Musical guest: "I Wanna Rock"—Snoop Dogg (featuring Quest Crew and The Ranger$)
- Guest dancer(s): The Legion of Extraordinary Dancers: "Yellow"—Vitamin String Quartet (Hip-Hop; Choreographer: Harry Shum, Jr., Christopher Scott, and Galen Hooks)
- Bottom 4 contestant's Solos:

Contestant	Style	Music	Result
Noelle Marsh	Contemporary	"Inside a Boy" (Son Lux Remix)—My Brightest Diamond	Eliminated
Ryan Di Lello	Paso Doble	"Rock You Like A Hurricane"—Scorpions	Safe
Kathryn McCormick	Contemporary	"Beautiful"—Bethany Dillon	Safe
Nathan Trasoras	Contemporary	"Pretty Wings"—Maxwell	Eliminated

- Eliminated:
  - Noelle Marsh
  - Nathan Trasoras

==== Week 7 (December 9, 2009) ====
- Group dance: Top 8: "Pon de Floor" (Samantha Ronson remix)—Major Lazer feat. Vybz Kartel (Jazz; Choreographer: Sonya Tayeh)
- Musical guests:

- "Nobody"—Wonder Girls
- "Live Like We're Dying"—Kris Allen

- Bottom 4 contestant's solos:

Contestant	Style	Music	Result
Jonathan "Legacy" Perez	Breakdance	"Flashing Lights"—Vitamin String Quartet	Eliminated
Ellenore Scott	Jazz	"Hajnal"—Venetian Snares	Safe
Ryan Di Lello	Cha-Cha	"Din Da Da"—Kevin Aviance	Safe
Mollee Gray	Jazz	"You'll Find A Way" (Switch & Sinden Remix)—Santigold	Eliminated

==== Week 8 (Finale) (December 16, 2009) ====
- Judges: Lil' C, Tyce Diorio, Debbie Allen, Adam Shankman, Mary Murphy, Nigel Lythgoe
- Musical Guests:

- "I See You"—Leona Lewis
- "Whataya Want from Me"—Adam Lambert
- "I Am"—Mary J. Blige
- "Louboutins"—Jennifer Lopez

- Guest dancers The Groovaloos ("Groovaloo Street"—Rapier & Burns)
- Group dances:

Contestants	Style	Music	Choreographer
Top 20	Jazz	"Scared of Me"—Fedde le Grand featuring Mitch Crown	Kelley Abbey
Top 20	Jazz	"Comanche"—The Revels	Wade Robson; Amanda Robson

===== Judges' picks =====
Contestants	Style	Music	Choreographer	Chosen by
Russell Ferguson; Kevin Hunte; Jonathan "Legacy" Perez	Hip-Hop	"Beggin' (District 78 mix)"—Madcon	Tabitha and Napoleon D'umo	Lil' C
Ellenore Scott; Jakob Karr	Contemporary	"Tore My Heart"—OONA and Dave Tweedie	Sonya Tayeh	Adam Shankman
Phillip Attmore; Bianca Revels; Peter Sabasino	Tap	"Take the "A" Train"—Ella Fitzgerald	Derick K. Grant	Nigel Lythgoe
Ashleigh Di Lello; Ryan Di Lello	Jive	"Straight to... Number One (Duck's Radio Mix)"—Touch and Go	Ashleigh Di Lello; Ryan Di Lello	Mary Murphy
Kathryn McCormick; Jakob Karr	Contemporary	"At This Moment"—Michael Bublé	Dwight Rhoden; Desmond Richardson	Nigel Lythgoe
Mollee Gray; Nathan Trasoras	Bollywood	"Azeem O Shaan Shahenshah" from Jodhaa Akbar	Nakul Dev Mahajan	Tyce Diorio
Ellenore Scott; Jonathan "Legacy" Perez	Contemporary	"Machine Gun"—Portishead	Travis Wall	Adam Shankman
Noelle Marsh; Russell Ferguson	African Jazz	"Frog Dance"—Mickey Hart and Planet Drum^{7}	Sean Cheesman	Debbie Allen
Channing Cooke; Ariana DeBose; Jakob Karr; Nathan Trasoras	Contemporary	"Crying"—k.d. lang	Tyce Diorio	Lil' C
Kathryn McCormick; Russell Ferguson	Hip-Hop	"I Can Transform Ya"—Chris Brown ft. Lil Wayne and Swizz Beats^{7}	Tabitha and Napoleon D'umo	Mary Murphy
Top 20	Jazz	"Comanche"—The Revels ^{7}	Wade Robson; Amanda Robson (co-conceived)	Nigel Lythgoe

^7 As Ferguson injured himself performing in the first Judge's Pick routine, the noted subsequent routines were shown pre-recorded rather than newly performed live.

- 6th Place
  - Ryan Di Lello
- 5th Place
  - Ashleigh Di Lello
- 4th Place
  - Ellenore Scott
- 3rd Place
  - Kathryn McCormick
- Runner-up
  - Jakob Karr
- Winner
  - Russell Ferguson

== Promotion ==
As a result of the auditions for season 6 taking place concurrently with the airing of season 5, increased promotion was possible. A Deeley voice-over at the end of the fifth season's audition episodes sent viewers to the official website for more information about auditioning for the fall season. The judges' travels to various cities were also mentioned if the audition weekend followed a results show. A video segment of Ryan Kasprzak, brother of top 20 contestant Evan Kasprzak and fellow auditioner for season 5, aired during the summer's top 18 results show. It showed him auditioning for season 6 in Los Angeles and making it to the Las Vegas round. Nigel Lythgoe also mentioned him in the finale of season 5, stating that there will be "more Kasprzak in the fall." Since then, however, it was announced Kasprzak was eliminated after the ballroom round of Vegas week.

== Foreign broadcast ==
Unlike previous seasons, much of season 6 was not simulcast on Canadian network CTV, due to conflicts with their fall schedule. As a result, CTV's sister network 'A' aired the series from its start until the end of November, with CTV resuming with the Top 10 week on December 1. Norwegian channel TVNorge will air the show in performance and results shows, and shows all routines, as it did in season 5. In South Africa the season is set to premier in February. AXN Asia also aired this season just after the season 4 ended airing in January 2010.

Australia finally airs this season since the fifth season back in 2009 on Network Ten. This season premiered on January 15, 2011, on the new channel Eleven.

== Special performance episode ==
On October 26, 2009, Fox aired a special episode introducing viewers to the Top 20 contestants of season 6 dancing in their own styles. Contemporary dancer Billy Bell appeared in the special before having to withdraw due to illness.

=== Changes ===
Besides not starting results shows until the Top 16, this will be the first season where the finale will occur at the Top 6 stage, rather than the usual Top 4. This is most likely due to the show producers and network not wishing to continue airing through the week of Christmas, due to the special performance show.

== Ratings ==
=== U.S. Nielsen ratings ===
Show	Episode	First air date	Rating (18–49)	Share (18–49)	Viewers (millions)	Rank (timeslot)	Rank (night)
1	Audition Episode #1	September 9, 2009	3.9	6	6.6	1	5
2	Audition Episode #2	September 16, 2009	3.6	6	5.7	2	6
3	Audition Episode #3	September 23, 2009	3.5	6	5.5	4	13
4	Audition Episode #4	September 29, 2009	3.0	5	5.2	3	8
5	Audition Episode #5	September 30, 2009	4.1	7	6.8	4	13 (tied)
6	Audition Episode #6	October 6, 2009	3.3	5	5.5	3	10
7	Las Vegas Round	October 7, 2009	4.0	7	6.2	4	12
8	Las Vegas Round	October 14, 2009	4.4	7	7.2	3	9 (tied)
9	Las Vegas Round/Top 20 Chosen	October 21, 2009	4.3	7	6.9	2 (tied)	8 (tied)
10	Meet the Top 20	October 26, 2009	3.6	5	5.8	3 (tied)	10 (tied)
11	Top 20 Perform	October 27, 2009	4.0	6	6.5	4	8
12	Top 18 Perform	November 3, 2009	3.8	6	6.1	4	9
13	Top 16 Perform	November 10, 2009	3.6	6	5.8	4	9
14	2 of 16 Voted Off	November 11, 2009	3.6	6	5.7	4	9
15	Top 14 Perform	November 17, 2009	3.9	6	6.0	4	9
16	2 of 14 Voted Off	November 18, 2009	3.5	6	5.7	4	13
17	Top 12 Perform	November 24, 2009	3.3	5	5.5	4	7
18	2 of 12 Voted Off	November 25, 2009	3.0	5	4.9	4	12
19	Top 10 Perform	December 1, 2009	3.7	6	5.8	2	4
20	2 of 10 Voted Off	December 2, 2009	2.3	7	6.5	3	5 (tied)
21	Top 8 Perform	December 8, 2009	3.8	6	6.2	4	8
22	2 of 8 Voted Off	December 9, 2009	4.2	7	6.7	4	13
23	Top 6 Perform	December 15, 2009	3.8	6	6.3	3	5
24	Winner Announced	December 16, 2009	4.3	7	7.1	2	5

== See also ==
- List of So You Think You Can Dance finalists
