= Rize (soundtrack) =

Music from the Original Motion Picture: Rize

Soundtrack album by Various artists
- Released: June 21, 2005
- Recorded: 2005
- Genre: Hip hop
- Length: 75:00
- Label: Forster Bros. Entertainment
- Producer: David LaChapelle (exec.); Martin Shore; Jonathan Platt; Stu Song; Jonathan Scott Miller; Red Ronin

Music from the Original Motion Picture: Rize is the soundtrack album to the documentary movie by David LaChapelle, Rize. It was released on June 21, 2005 through Forster Brothers Entertainment and features songs by Flii Stylz, Dizzee Rascal, Christina Aguilera and others.

== Track listing ==
#	Title	Performer(s)	Time
1	"Rize" (w/ dialogue snippet)	Flii Stylz	2:53
2	"Break it on Down (Battlezone)"	Flii Stylz & Tenashus	4:48
3	"Fix Up, Look Sharp"	Dizzee Rascal	3:19
4	"Clownin' Out"	Flii Stylz & Dap Daniel	3:51
5	"I Krump" (w/ dialogue snippet)	Flii Stylz	5:33
6	"Soar"	Christina Aguilera	4:46
7	"Oh Happy Day"	The Edwin Hawkins Singers	3:00
8	"Get Krumped"	Flii Stylz, Lil' C & Blozart	4:11
9	"Make You Dance"	Flii Stylz, Tenashus & Dap Daniel	3:00
10	"Beastly"	Flii Stylz	3:23
11	"Ready to Brawl"	Dap Daniel & Planet Asia	5:08
12	"Recognize"	Flii Stylz	7:07
13	"By and By"	The Blind Boys of Alabama	5:45
14	"Seek Ye The Lord"	The Caravans	5:45
15	"Amazing Grace"	Alice Ridley	5:37
16	"Rize Score Suite"	A&J Music Productions, Flii Stylz & Red Ronin	0:00
