= Miss Prissy (disambiguation) =

Miss Prissy is a character in Looney Tunes.

Miss Prissy may also refer to:

- Miss Prissy (dancer), a dancer who starred in the 2005 documentary Rize
- Miss Prissy Diamond, a character in 1859 novel The Minister's Wooing by Harriet Beecher Stowe
- Miss Prissy, or Priscilla Tomboy, primary role in the 1767 English comic opera The Romp
- "Miss Prissy", a song by Lambchop from Tools in the Dryer

== See also ==
- "Little Miss Prissy", a song by the Stay Cats from Gonna Ball
