= Russell Ferguson =

American dancer

Russell Ferguson is an American Krump dancer from Boston, Massachusetts. He won So You Think You Can Dance season 6, making him the first Krump contestant to win the title. Russell is a graduate of the Boston Arts Academy and attended the University of the Arts in Philadelphia as a dance major.

== So You Think You Can Dance ==
Russell competed on season 6 of the FOX reality dance competition, So You Think You Can Dance. His partner for weeks 1-5 was Noelle Marsh. However, before taping began, Noelle was injured and unable to dance, so during the taping of week 1, Russell danced with their choreographer, Melanie LaPatin. In week 6 he danced with Mollee Gray. His partner for week 7 was to be Ashleigh Di Lello, but due to injury, she was unable to dance during the show's taping. As the first Krump contestant to make it to Vegas, into the Top 20, Top 10 and Finale, Russell went on to win the competition. Unfortunately, he was injured during the finale and was unable to perform his remaining routines.

Week	Partner(s)	Thing/style	Music	Choreographer(s)	Result
1	Kevin Hunte; Jonathan "Legacy" Perez	Hip-Hop	"Beggin' (District 78 Mix)"—Madcon	Tabitha and Napoleon D'umo	—
1	Melanie LaPatin	Foxtrot	"Vagabond Shoes"—Vic Damone	Tony Meredith; Melanie LaPatin	Bottom 4
1	—	Solo (Krump)	"Give the Drummer Sum"—Black Milk	—	Safe
2	Noelle Marsh	Hip-Hop	"Move Shake Drop (Remix)"—DJ Laz, Flo Rida & Casley	Jamal Sims	Safe
3	Noelle Marsh	African Jazz	"Frog Dance"—Mickey Hart and Planet Drum	Sean Cheesman	Safe
4	Noelle Marsh	Foxtrot	"Baby (You've Got What It Takes)"—Michael Bublé and Sharon Jones & The Dap-Kings	Edward Simon	Safe
5	Noelle Marsh	Samba	"Hips Don't Lie"—Shakira	Tony Meredith; Melanie LaPatin	Safe
5	Noelle Marsh	Contemporary	"A Case of You"—Diana Krall	Tyce Diorio	Safe
6	Mollee Gray	Lyrical Jazz	"It Must Have Been Love"—Roxette	Mandy Moore	Safe
6	Mollee Gray	Jive	"Land of 1000 Dances"—Jimmy Barnes	Anya Garnis; Pasha Kovalev	Safe
6	—	Solo (Krump)	"Outros"—Black Milk	—	Safe
7	Rachel (assistant)	Hip-Hop	"Too Much Booty 2" (Bobby J Remix)—Soundmaster T & Jah-Rista featuring Korveil	Shane Sparks	Safe
7	Alicia (assistant)	Bollywood	"Spirit of Rangeela" from Rangeela	Nakul Dev Mahajan	Safe
7	—	Solo (Krump)	"Holiday Buckness"—J-Squad	—	Safe
8	Ashleigh Di Lello	Lyrical Jazz	"Angel Standing By"—Jewel	Sonya Tayeh	Winner
8	Ellenore Scott	Paso Doble	"Village Attack" from Blood Diamond	Jason Gilkison	Winner
8	Kathryn McCormick	Hip-Hop	"I Can Transform Ya"—Chris Brown feat. Lil Wayne & Swizz Beatz	Tabitha and Napoleon D'umo	Winner

== After So You Think You Can Dance ==
Russell was a cast member of the 2013 Anthony William's Urban Nutcracker in Boston, MA. Ferguson will appear in the popular prologue that features a face-off between two different genres of dance and will also appear in dance scenes as the Soldier Doll and Caviar Caper. In 2014, he judged an episode of So You Think You Can Dance, China.

Preceded by Jeanine Mason	Winner of So You Think You Can Dance; Fall 2009	Succeeded by Lauren Froderman
