= Pellicoro =

Pellicoro is a surname. Notable people with the surname include:

- Laura Pellicoro (born 2000), Italian middle-distance runner
- Paul Pellicoro (born 1956), American ballroom dancer, instructor, and choreographer
