= John Halpern (artist) =

American film director and producer

John Halpern a.k.a. John DiLeva Halpern is a filmmaker, conceptual artist, and performance artist based in New York City. He is known for cultural activism and documentaries about art, artists, and Tibetan Buddhism.

== Career ==
=== Cultural activism ===
In 1977, Halpern co-founded Art Corporation of America Incorporated. Collaborative performances included Bridging, an artist's uprising "media sculpture" in 1977. "To replace violence and fear in mass media for one day" seven artists, wearing brightly colored jump-suits and safety harnesses, climbed the seven largest bridges connected to Manhattan. "Each executed an individual work or performance atop their bridge. At the peak of their collective ascents, bright yellow smoke flares were ignited on each bridge, unifying the artists as a team," resulting in rush hour traffic disruption and media attention. The artists/climbers, also including Greg Pickard, Paul Pellicoro, Jack Bashkow, Gianfranco Mantegna, Tony Sapp, Anthony Seidenberg, Janet Applegate and peace activist Ruth Russell, were arrested. Charges were later dismissed. Conceptual artist and provocateur Joseph Beuys described it as "the first social-sculpture to use mass-media as art.” ABC's Eyewitness News named it 1977's Best News of the Year. The piece garnered international attention and the cover of the New York Post. His film Bridging, 1977 documented the event.

In 1979, Halpern attempted another "bridging" "social sculpture," planting gunpowder, fireworks, batteries and a radio receiver in a bucket on a tower of the Brooklyn Bridge. This led to his arrest and hospitalization for possessing a bomb.

A 24-hour performance in 1979 - 1980 by the Art Corporation of America comprised digging a 10-foot hole on Spring Street between Mott and Elizabeth Streets in Soho, where 12 - 15 people planned "to stay in the hole to see the New Year in, "discussing art and politics.""

From the late 1980s through the 1990s Halpern created public interactive art and media sculptures internationally. His work gave viewers the artist's point of view with the motto “Consumers are the producers of the future.” In Smokesculpture over 1000 participants breathed cigarette smoke into a large plastic bag which was mailed back to cigarette manufacturers, in 1988. In Breathsculpture he lived in an hermetically sealed glass house for 10 days with 10,000 plants, breathing once per minute, in Holland in 1989. Fresh Air brought mobile, interactive breathing stations filled with plants to the street. Over 100,000 people participated in America and Europe starting in 1990.

=== Documentaries ===
His 1988 film, Transformer/Joseph Beuys is an "influential portrait" of Beuys preparing for the only retrospective done in his lifetime, in 1979 at the Guggenheim Museum in Manhattan. Billed as a Joseph Beuys and John Halpern Collaboration, Beuys led Halpern through the exhibition as he personally narrated and installed his artwork. Produced by I.T.A.P. Pictures and Ronald Feldman Fine Arts Gallery, the film is in many collections.

In 2006, he looked at how Westerners have been increasingly drawn to Eastern philosophy and Tibetan Buddhism in the film Refuge. That same year, with Les Levine, he also directed Talking with the Dalai Lama featuring the 14th Dalai Lama with Sakyong Mipham Rinpoche, Tenzin Palmo, and David Chadwick. Filmmakers and artists who explored Buddhism in their work, Kundun director Martin Scorsese, screenwriter Melissa Mathison, and music composer Philip Glass; Oliver Stone, director of Heaven and Earth; Dzongzar Khyentse Rinpoche, director of The Cup; and Bernardo Bertolucci, director of Little Buddha, were also interviewed.

Halpern directed and produced Saving Lieb House in 2010 with Jim Venturi, son of architects Robert Venturi and Denise Scott-Brown. The 30 minute film, about saving a 1960s Pop Art house they designed from demolition, followed the house being moved 200 miles by barge from Big Island, New Jersey to Manhattan.

=== Community Advocacy ===
On September 25, 2019, Halpern presented "Betrayal on 14th Street," an unfinished community advocacy film at the invitation of Myra Manning, founder of Citizens United for Safety, Park Slope, Brooklyn. The community meeting was held to discuss the conditions under which new bike lanes were created on 9th Street. "Chaos erupted" when Halpern opened by challenging Transportation Alternatives, a pro-cycling lobbying organization, of planting "paid activists" in the audience, alleging that their funding comes from elitist backers "the likes of billionaire Steve Ross, a crony of Jeff Epstein." Halpern stated "the majority of people in the room don’t live here. My suspicion is at least 40 percent are lobbyists or friends of lobbyists."

=== Other activities ===
Halpern has written about Tibetan issues, and taught film at the Pratt Institute and the New York Film Academy.
