= Samba Squad =

Canadian percussion group

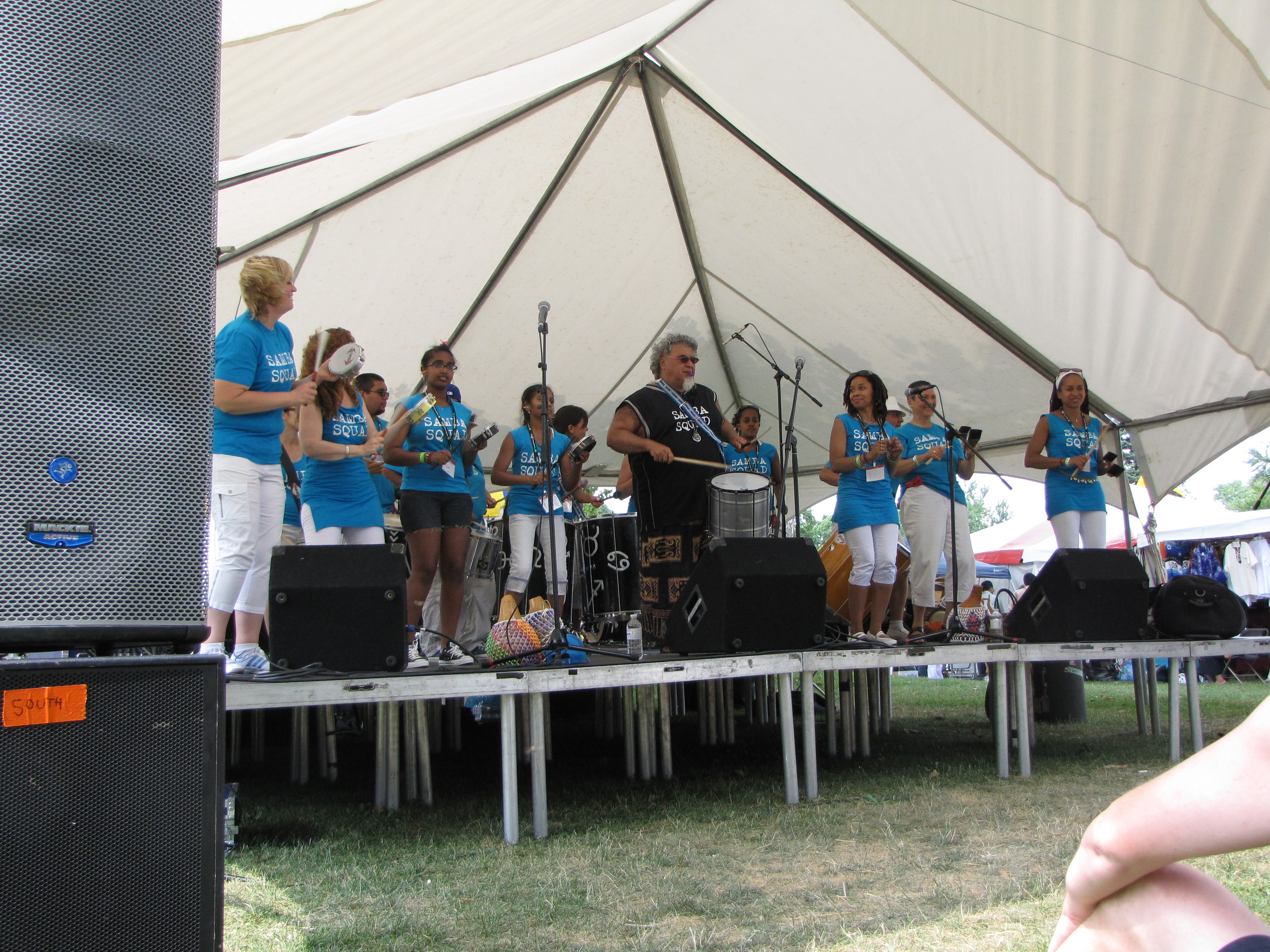
- Samba Squad performing at SunFest Festival in 2010

Background information
- Origin: Canada
- Genres: World, samba
- Years active: 1999–present
- Members: Rick Shadrach Lazar
- Website: www.sambasquad.com

Samba Squad is a Canadian world music group. The Squad was formed in 1999 by percussionist Rick Shadrach Lazar. The band incorporates world rhythms performed on Brazilian Bateria drums and percussion. Their musical style combines samba with other styles such as salsa, soca, reggae and funk. Samba Squad was awarded the UMAC (Urban Music Association of Canada) Award for Best World Recording of 2001 for their self-titled debut album. They are a popular group well known for the energy of their live shows.

== Appearances ==
Samba Squad has performed in the Toronto Downtown Jazz Festival, Roots & Blues Festival at Salmon Arms, British Columbia, London's Sun Fest, Ottawa Jazz Festival, and Muhtadi's International Drum Fest in Tobago. It has also performed at sporting events such as the Toronto Raptors, Toronto Argos, and Blue Jays half-time shows and has many television appearances such as the Governor General's Awards CBC Television, The Toronto Show, Breakfast Television, and Open Mike with Mike Bullard. The band is a frequent participant in Toronto-area community festivals such as Caribana, the Pride Parade, the Beaches International Jazz Festival, the Kensington Festival of Lights, AfroFest, Salsa on St. Clair and others.

In 2004, VisionTV and Bravo! along with Riddle Films co-produced an hour documentary about the group. Samba Squad: Drums We Love was broadcast on both VisionTV and BRAVO on a second window.

Samba Squad opened for Grammy and Juno award-winning singer Sarah McLachlan and is a regular guest performer for Canadian Nuevo Flamenco guitarist Jesse Cook, appearing on two of his CDs as well as his recent DVD. The group has also performed with other international acts such as Antibalas.

In August 2007, Samba Squad performed at Cree Fest in Kashechewan (James Bay), Ontario, in celebration of the Cree culture and the community's 50th anniversary. Samba Squad is the first group of its kind to be honored with such an invitation. While there, Samba Squad participated in ground-breaking collaborations with the Shawanda dancers.

Samba Squad performed in City TV's 2008/2009 New Year's Eve live television gala at Nathan Phillips Square, which included a collaboration with award-winning Canadian singer-songwriter Leslie Feist.

An edited version of the track "Maracatu Funk", from the album Batuque, was used for a dance number during the Week 2 episode, which aired on November 3, 2009, of the 6th Season of the US version of Fox Television's So You Think You Can Dance, featuring dancers Channing Cooke and Phillip Attmore performing a Samba dance number.

== Discography ==
=== Albums ===
- Samba Squad (2000)
- Batuque (2006)
- Mozambique (2012)
- Que Beleza (2013)

=== DVD ===
- Samba Squad: Drums We Love (2007)

== Awards and nominations ==
- Awarded the Urban Music Association of Canada (UMAC) Award for Best World Recording of 2001 for their self-titled debut album
