= Boston Arts Academy =

American high school (1998-)

Coordinates: 42.3469°N 71.0938°W

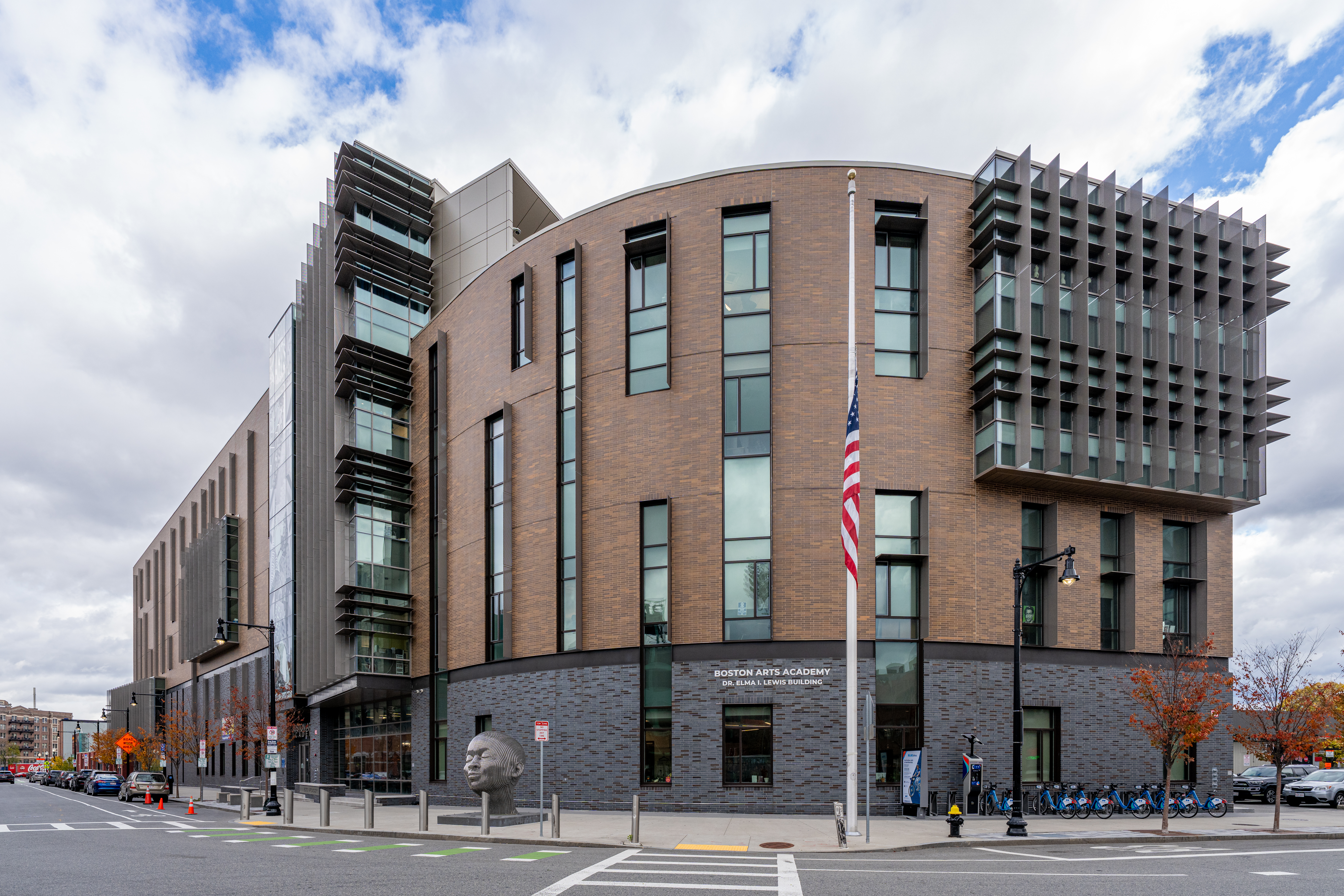
- (2025)

Location
- 11 Charles St. Boston, Massachusetts 02122; United States

Information
- School type: Public high school
- Founded: 1998
- School district: Boston Public Schools
- Dean: Tyrone Sutton, Arts Dean; Joy Bautista, Academic Dean
- Headmaster: Anne R. Clark
- Grades: 9-12
- Enrollment: 500 (2024-2025)
- Classes offered: Academics, The Arts
- Hours in school day: 8
- Athletics conference: Boston City League
- Affiliations: ProArts Consortium
- Website: bostonartsacademy.org

Boston Arts Academy (BAA) in Boston, Massachusetts, USA is the city's first and only high school for the visual and performing arts and is a partnership between Boston Public Schools and the ProArts Consortium. ProArts, a group of six arts colleges and universities in the Boston area, pushed the city to open the school, which was founded in 1998. The Consortium continues to support the school with performance space, music lessons and free college-level classes to BAA students.

BAA won the John F. Kennedy Center for the Performing Arts, the National Schools of Distinction in Arts Education Award for the 2009–2010 school year from the Kennedy Center Alliance for Arts Education Network.

Construction of new facilities at 174 Ipswich Street commenced July 1, 2018, leading to relocation of both Boston Arts Academy and the Boston Arts Academy Foundation.

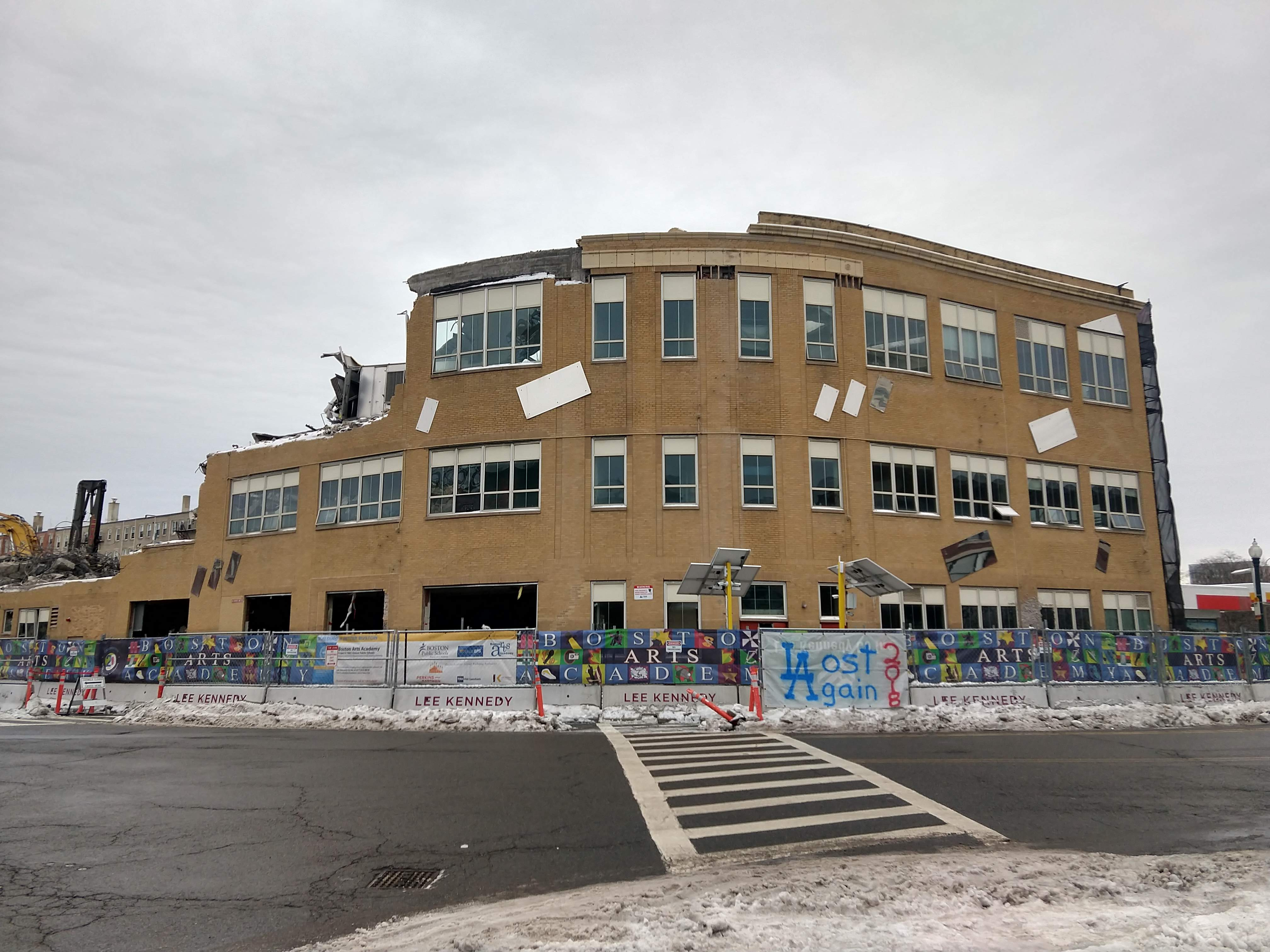
Original building of the Boston Arts Academy partially demolished, January 2019

== Programs ==
BAA is Boston's only public school dedicated to the arts. The school day has no sports, yet is eight hours, two hours longer than normal schools, to allow for classes in the arts disciplines. BAA was also Boston's first full-inclusion high school; students with disabilities are fully integrated into the school program.

Although admission is academic-blind, eighth graders must audition to be accepted to the performing arts program. In 2007, only 27% of the dance applicants were accepted, just 6% were accepted to the drumming program; and just 25 of the 81 theater applicants. BAA had 800 applicants for 150 slots in 2011.

BAA offers an education to urban youth who come from less-than ideal backgrounds.

In 2010, the school ran a pilot program for 125 ninth graders in summer school, who spent Fridays at BAA in remedial courses with recent BAA graduates as teachers. The students had very poor attendance records and social problems, such as direct experience with violence. Most were in danger of not being promoted. The program was set up to rekindle an interest in school through non-traditional learning using theater, music, martial arts, poetry and other art forms.

BAA is a member of the ProArts Consortium. Other members include Berklee College of Music, the Boston Architectural Center, The Boston Conservatory, Emerson College, Massachusetts College of Art, and the School of the Museum of Fine Arts. ProArts coordinates programs among its members to expand educational opportunities and resources for participating institutions and works to enrich the arts and arts education in Boston and throughout the Commonwealth of Massachusetts.

== Notable alumni ==
- Russell Ferguson, winner of season 6, So You Think You Can Dance
- Diane Guerrero, actress (rose to prominence with role in Orange Is the New Black)
- David Davidson, guitarist with the band Revocation
- Isaac Akiba, principal with the Boston Ballet Company
- Kori King, drag queen (rose to prominence on season 17 of Rupaul's Drag Race)
