= Lil' C =

- Born: Christoper A. Toler; 1983 (age 42–43)
- Origin: Los Angeles, California, U.S.
- Genres: Krumping, Hip-hop, Hip hop music
- Occupations: Dancer, choreographer, musician
- Years active: 2001–present

Christopher "Lil' C" Toler (born January 19, 1983) is an American dancer, choreographer, and musician best known for his choreography and judging on the TV show So You Think You Can Dance, and for his appearance in the 2005 krumping documentary Rize. Since appearing in the film, he has danced for several musical artists including Missy Elliott, Fall Out Boy, and Madonna, and was cast as a featured dancer in the 2007 art exhibit Slow Dancing. He continues to serve as a guest judge on So You Think You Can Dance. Additionally, Lil' C has expanded his artistic career into music under the name LongLiveCzar, releasing original music and collaborating with prominent artists like Chris Brown, Anderson .Paak, and Kehlani.

== Dance and choreography career ==
Lil' C has appeared in music videos for artists such as Jennifer Lopez, Ciara, Missy Elliott, Christina Milian, Sean Paul, Fall Out Boy, Gwen Stefani, Seven, and Madonna. He has also choreographed for television programs and movies including Be Cool, Bones, the 2007 Teen Choice Awards, the 2007 NAACP Image Awards, and Bring It On Again. Other television credits include The 50th Annual Grammy Awards, VH1 Big in 06 Awards, and the 2005 American Music Awards. He also appeared in the films Stomp the Yard (2007), Center Stage: Turn It Up (2008), and You Got Served: Beat the World (2011).

Lil' C was featured in the 2005 documentary Rize, a film that documents the history of the krumping and clowning dance styles from Los Angeles.

Since 2006, Lil' C has been a judge and choreographer on the Fox reality dance competition So You Think You Can Dance. He choreographed one dance routine in season two, season four, season six, and season seven, and two routines in season three. Although he has not choreographed any dance numbers since season seven, he has still served as a guest judge. He has also choreographed for So You Think You Can Dance Canada. He choreographed two routines for the first season and another routine for the second season.

In 2007, Lil' C was cast in the David Michalek traveling exhibit Slow Dancing, "a series of 43 larger-than-life, hyper-slow-motion video portraits of dancers and choreographers from around the world, displayed on multiple screens. Each [dancer]'s movement (approximately 5 seconds long) was shot on a specially constructed set using a high-speed, high-definition camera recording at 1,000 frames per second (standard film captures 24 frames per second). The result is approximately 10 minutes of extreme slow motion." The exhibit has traveled to New York City, Los Angeles, Toronto, Venice, and London.

In 2010, Lil' C appeared in the second season of Dance Your Ass Off as a guest judge. He also played the character Z in the web series The Legion of Extraordinary Dancers.

== Music: LongLiveCzar ==
In addition to his dance career, Lil' C performs under the stage name "LongLiveCzar" as a musician. He has collaborated with notable artists such as Anderson .Paak, Chris Brown, Kehlani, and French Montana, contributing as a songwriter and producer. He co-wrote the hit single Post To Be by Omarion featuring Chris Brown and Jhené Aiko, which became a chart-topping success.

As a solo artist, he has released tracks including Sicario, Oh My!, and Wet. He continues to create and release new music through digital platforms such as YouTube and Spotify under the name LongLiveCZAR. His music blends his background in dance with his passion for hip-hop, making him a multi-talented artist.

You can find his music and updates on social media:

- [LongLiveCzar on YouTube](https://www.youtube.com/@longliveczar7636)
- [LongLiveCzar on Spotify](https://open.spotify.com/artist/0aC14cRZTNeNkLGHXAFM6x?si=q__fx1dhT12SUH5Ef6Q9ZA)

== Legacy and influence ==
As one of the pioneers of Krumping, Lil' C's contributions have helped establish this street dance style as a global cultural movement. His involvement in Rize gave Krumping visibility and authenticity, inspiring countless dancers worldwide. Through his work on So You Think You Can Dance, Lil' C helped bring urban street dance styles to mainstream audiences, emphasizing the athleticism and emotional depth involved in these forms of expression.

He was noted for his ability to articulate aspects of dance as a judge and choreographer. His choreography, rooted in the rawness of street dance, has been showcased on stages across the world, from televised competitions to major music videos.

Beyond dance, Lil' C has expanded into the music industry as LongLiveCzar, where he continues to create and perform music that blends his background in dance with his love for hip-hop. His evolution from a street dancer to a multi-faceted artist illustrates his versatility and continued influence on both dance and music culture.

== See also ==
- List of dancers
