= Rize (film) =

- Theatrical release poster
- Directed by: David LaChapelle
- Produced by: Marc Hawker; David LaChapelle
- Starring: Lil' C; Tommy the Clown; Miss Prissy
- Cinematography: Morgan Susser
- Edited by: Fernando Villena
- Music by: Amy Marie Beauchamp; Jose Cancela
- Distributed by: Lions Gate Films
- Release date: June 24, 2005
- Running time: 86 minutes
- Country: United States
- Language: English
- Budget: $700,000
- Box office: $4.6 million

Rize is an American documentary film by David LaChapelle, starring Lil' C, Tommy the Clown and Miss Prissy. It documents urban culture and dancing competition surrounding two different forms, clowning and krumping. It released in Summer 2005 and produced by Lions Gate Films.

== Synopsis ==
Rize is a documentary following an interview schedule of two related dancing subcultures of Los Angeles called clowning and krumping. The first series of interviews introduces, describes and develops the dance style known as clowning. A descendant of 1980s breakdancing, clowning is a contemporary street art all its own, characterized by speedy, flowing limbs, feverish shakes, hipness, and confounding athletic tricks. Tommy Johnson, better known by his alias, Tommy the Clown, is a former drug dealer and a man with a mission. For Tommy, clowning is more than an aesthetic hobby: in an area besieged by drive-by shootings, drug deals and unemployment; clowning is his way of offering an optimistic alternative for youngsters, a means of self-expression and a chance to channel positive energy.

The second series of interviews and footage explains how the dance style known as krumping evolved from clowning and matured into its own identity. Like clowning, krumping is characterized by free, expressive exaggerated, and highly energetic movement. The youths who started krumping, known as Lil C' and Miss Prissy, saw the dance as a way for them to escape gang life and "to release anger, aggression and frustration positively, in a non-violent way."

The third section of the film depicts a dance battle called The Battle Zone which takes place between clowns and krumpers at the Great Western Forum in 2004. The film style and soundtrack draws creative ties between African dance rituals and the developing style of krumping.

== Production ==
The film Rize was written and directed by David LaChapelle. Working alongside LaChapelle were executive producers Ishbel Whitaker, Barry Peele, Ellen Jacobson-Clarke, Stavros Merjos, and Rebecca Skinner, but filmed in early-mid 2004. Rize focuses on the African-American communities of clowns and krumpers in South Central Los Angeles. Most of these dancers are young, poor, and would be classified as "at risk." Director David LaChapelle follows these dancers from rehearsal to Battlezone, an annual dance competition, alternating between footage of the dancing and interviews with the dancers and their families.

The film is set in the outskirts of South Central Los Angeles–areas such as Inglewood and Compton that have become synonymous in the American popular imagination with deviances of all kinds, due to representations in news media, music, and film. However, LaChapelle does not begin the film in the present day. Focusing instead on the history of racial conflict in South Central, including footage of the Watts riots of 1965 and the 1992 Rodney King riots.

LaChapelle situates his film deliberately within a racially specific violence. The film is dedicated to a dancer named Quinesha (Lil Dimples) Dunford, who was killed with a 13-year old friend in a 2003 drive-by shooting, and not one of the dancers within the film is without a story like Quinesha's to tell.

== Soundtrack ==
- Rize (soundtrack)

The documentary features original material by Flii Stylz ("Rize", "I Krump", "Beastly", and "Recognize"), Christina Aguilera ("Soar"), and an introduction by British hip-hop star Dizzee Rascal ("Fix Up, Look Sharp"), as well as a number of traditional gospel songs, including the Edwin Hawkins Singers' "Oh Happy Day".

== Reception ==
Rize received positive reviews from critics. On Rotten Tomatoes, the film has an 84% rating based on 91 reviews, with an average rating of 7/10. The site's consensus reads, “ The dances in Rize are electric even if the documentary doesn’t go that deeply into the performers’ lives. Metacritic reports a 74 out of 100 rating based on 29 critics. Roger Ebert of the Chicago Sun-Times stated “the most remarkable thing about Rize is that it is real.” Sid Smith of the Chicago Tribune stated that Rize is, “a compelling, bittersweet hybrid of a movie, one celebrating an enormous and hitherto unsung underground talent, while suggesting that art goes only so far in solving the enormous challenges of the underprivileged life.”

Robert Koehler of Variety gave the film an 80 out of 100 and stated that, “Rize is an eye-popping lensing and an appreciation of social complexities combined for an entirely satisfying experience.”

The movie was released domestically in the United States and also internationally in France, Australia, Germany, United Kingdom, New Zealand, Austria, among others.

== Cast ==
- Lil' C as himself
- Tommy the Clown as himself
- Dragon (now called Slayer) as himself
- Ceasare "Tight Eyez" Willis as himself
- La Niña as herself
- Miss Prissy as herself
- Wild Boi as himself
- Larry as himself
- Lil' Mama as herself (not to be confused with the rapper Lil' Mama)
- Big Mijo as himself
- Baby Tight Eyez as Christian Jones
- Daisy as herself
- Lil Tommy the Clown (Shannon Hill) as himself
- Termite (Shontae Williams)

== Awards and nominations ==
- 2004 – Winner, Aspen Short Fest: Best Documentary
- 2004 – Sundance Film Festival: Short Filmmaking Award
- 2006 – Winner, Bangkok International Film Festival: Best Documentary

== See also ==
- Krumping
