= Marcelo Epstein =

Argentinian academic

- Born: Buenos Aires
- Education: Doctor of Philosophy
- Alma mater: Technion – Israel Institute of Technology
- Employer: University of Calgary
- Awards: Association of Professional Engineers and Geoscientists of Alberta (2020)

Marcelo Epstein (born in Buenos Aires, Argentina and Canadian citizen living in Calgary, Alberta) is an Argentinian professor of Schulich School of Engineering (Department of Mechanical and Manufacturing Engineering) and an adjunct professor of Classics and Religion of the Faculty of Humanities at the University of Calgary. Epstein has made "contributions in the fields of continuum mechanics and the biomechanics of soft-tissue growth and remodelling".

== Life ==
=== Education ===
Marcelo Epstein obtained a B.S. of Civil Engineering (cum Laude) at the University of Buenos Aires in 1967. Epstein accepted a scholarship to study at the Technion - Israel Institute of Technology and in 1970 he earned a M.S. of Civil Engineering (cum Laude), and from 1972 he holds a Doctor of Philosophy Civil Engineering with the dissertation A General Kinematic Approach to the Nonlinear Analysis of Structures with Applications to the Theory of Shells under the tutelage of Yair Tene. In 1993 he earned a B.A. Classics (first class honours) at the University of Calgary.

=== Teaching ===
From 1969 to 1972 Marcelo Epstein was an instructor at the Technion – Israel Institute of Technology and from 1972 to 1973 he become a Lecturer. From 1974 to 1975 Epstein was a Post-Doctoral Fellow of Civil Engineering, and from 1975 to 1976 a Research Associate at the University of Alberta. Epstein was an Assistant Professor (1976-1979), Associate Professor (1979-1983) and Full Professor (1983-present) in the Department of Mechanical and Manufacturing Engineering, and an adjunct professor of the Faculty of Kinesiology (1992-2012) at the University of Calgary. From 2002 to 2012, he has held the University Professorship in Rational Mechanics at the University of Calgary. From 2000 to the present Epstein is adjunct professor of the Faculty of Arts (Greek and Roman Studies) at the University of Calgary.

== Awards ==
- 2020 Frank Spragins Technical Award, APEGA.
- 2014 Tullio Levi-Civita award in Differential Geometry and Mechanics awarded by the International Research Center on Mathematics and Mechanics of Complex Systems, at the 17th U.S. National Congress on Theoretical and Applied Mechanics, held in Lansing, Michigan, in June 2014.
- 2009 CANCAM Medal, June 2009.
- 2002 University Professorship in Rational Mechanics, University of Calgary.
- 2000 Elected Fellow of the American Academy of Mechanics (AAM).

=== Recognitions ===
- 2017 Special Issue of the journal Mathematics and Mechanics of Solids.
- 2015 Honoree of the 53rd meeting of the Society for Natural Philosophy, Calgary, August, 2015.
- 2013 Included in the section of selected biographies in the major historical work by G.A. Maugin.
- 2005 Research Excellence Award, Department of Mechanical and Manufacturing Engineering, University of Calgary.

== Works ==
=== Thesis ===
- Epstein, Marcelo (1972). A General Kinematic Approach to the Nonlinear Analysis of Structures with Applications to the Theory of Shells (Ph.D. Diss. Technion-Israel Institute of Technology 1972).

== Sources ==
- AAM. "Fellow". American Academy of Mechanics.
- Fondazione Tullio Levi Civita. "Laudatio Marcelo Epstein" (PDF). University of L'Aquila. "For his innovative way of linking geometrical concepts to mechanical and biological phenomena. He can be considered as a founding father in continuum mechanics and its applications, including geometrical mechanics of defects, theory of inhomogeneities, configurational mechanics, and mechanics of muscles."
- UCalgary. "Marcelo Epstein". University of Calgary.
- APEGA (2020). "2020 Frank Spragins Technical Award Recipient".
- North Dakota State University. "Marcelo Epstein". Ph.D. Technion-Israel Institute of Technology 1972.
