= Tommy the Clown =

American dancer

- Born: Thomas Johnson; January 9, 1969 (age 57); Detroit, Michigan, U.S.
- Occupation: Dancer
- Years active: 1992 - present

Thomas Johnson, also known as Tommy the Clown, is an American dancer best known as the inventor of the "clowning" style of dance, which evolved into krumping. Johnson invented the style in 1992 to enhance birthday party clown acts, thereby creating the concept of "hip-hop clowns". Johnson and his followers have performed at birthday parties ranging from inner city communities to celebrities like Madonna, Pamela Anderson, and Cedric the Entertainer. He achieved international acclaim as the focus of David LaChapelle's 2005 documentary Rize. Tommy the Clown also danced with Ray Ray, of Mindless Behavior fame.

== Biography ==
Thomas Johnson was born in Detroit, Michigan, and was raised in South Central Los Angeles, California. Growing up, he was often in and out of trouble. After Johnson spent five years in jail, he realized that his lifestyle needed a significant change. He acquired a job as a typist clerk until 1992 when he received his first opportunity to perform; a co-worker asked him to be a clown at her child's birthday celebration because of his entertaining personality. He accepted the job, thus creating his Tommy the Clown persona. After this event, Tommy the Clown led the way in the stirring dance movement called "Clowning". He also developed this form of dance in response to the 1992 Los Angeles riots.

Tommy's performances incorporated the current music and dancing of the time, and he encouraged the children to get up and dance with him. He soon developed loyal followers throughout Los Angeles. He used this opportunity to give children the chance to take an interest in dancing rather than drugs or gang activity and established a dance crew called the Hip Hop Clowns who performed with him at parties. His only rules for his crew were as follows: "No gangs, No drugs, Do well in school (grades, attendance, and behavior), and be a role model by living a positive lifestyle at all times."

By 2000, there were over 60 clown crews in Los Angeles. To avoid clashing with these different groups, Tommy took it upon himself to hold weekly dance battles at his former Tommy the Clown Academy, where an audience judged who was best. The popularity of these contests flourished, and Tommy created and hosted the Battle Zone event—an official dance battle featuring community dancers and celebrity guests. Tommy's dance phenomenon caught the attention of the acclaimed director and photographer, David LaChapelle. Feeling inclined to capture this movement on film, LaChapelle directed the 2005 Lions Gate Films documentary Rize.

In 2024, Tommy was featured in Kendrick Lamar's The Pop Out: Ken & Friends and his "Not Like Us" music video, which was directed by Dave Free and Lamar.

== See also ==
- List of dancers
