= Otis Sallid =

American choreographer, director, and dancer

- Education: High School of Performing Arts; Juilliard School
- Occupations: Choreographer; director; dancer

Otis Sallid is an American choreographer, director, and dancer whose career spans film, television, Broadway, music video, and concert dance. Across those forms, his work has emphasized narrative and character, combining commercial choreography with influences from modern dance and ballet.

Sallid choreographed the Spike Lee films School Daze, Do the Right Thing, and Malcolm X. He also created opening sequences for It's Showtime at the Apollo and Living Single. His Broadway work includes co-conceiving Smokey Joe's Cafe and choreographing the 2022 revival of The Piano Lesson.

== Early life ==
Sallid grew up in Harlem, New York City. He began studying dance through a New York City anti-poverty arts program and subsequently received scholarships to attend the High School of Performing Arts and the Juilliard School.

At Juilliard, Sallid worked with choreographers Martha Graham and Antony Tudor. His early teachers and influences also included Pearl Primus, Jean-Léon Destiné, Anna Sokolow, and Eleo Pomare.

== Career ==
Sallid began his Broadway career as a performer, with credits in Purlie, Two Gentlemen of Verona, The Wiz, and Comin' Uptown. He later founded the New Art Ensemble dance company. After Debbie Allen, a former member of the ensemble, joined the television series Fame in 1982, she invited Sallid to become her assistant choreographer. He worked with Allen for five years. Sallid later compared that period to a personal film school, during which he learned to shape dance for the camera through preproduction, production, and postproduction.

His commercial choreography expanded to television, awards shows, and live performance. By 1986, his credits included The Richard Pryor Show, the Grammy Awards, and Allen's act at Radio City Music Hall.

Alongside this commercial work, Sallid continued creating concert choreography for the New Art Ensemble. The company presented A Night for Dancing at the Los Angeles Theatre Center in 1986. The program consisted of Love Songs, set to recordings by Stevie Wonder, and Hour of Power, a gospel ballet.

Sallid described his concert works as balletic and modern and developed pieces he called "healing dances". He sought to combine commercial and concert dance while emphasizing ideas, concepts, and nuances of movement rather than individual steps. The choreography of Love Songs and Hour of Power included references to the work of Alvin Ailey, Antony Tudor, and Martha Graham.

His collaboration with filmmaker Spike Lee began with School Daze in 1988. Sallid subsequently choreographed Do the Right Thing and Malcolm X, and later directed episodes of the television series Living Single. The Los Angeles Times described his choreography for Do the Right Thing as "electrifying".

Sallid also worked in regional theater, co-directing a 1989 revival of Ain't Misbehavin' for the Orange County Black Actors Theatre. He staged the production using period choreography based on dances of the 1920s and 1930s.

His screen work during the 1990s included choreography for the 1993 film Swing Kids. In an otherwise negative review, Los Angeles Times film critic Kenneth Turan described the film's dancing as "lively and energizing". Sallid also directed the music video for Arrested Development's "People Everyday", which received Best Rap Video at the 1993 MTV Video Music Awards.

Sallid returned to musical theater in 1994 with a revue featuring songs by Jerry Leiber and Mike Stoller, which he conceived, directed, and choreographed for its Chicago premiere. Titled Baby That's Rock 'n' Roll, the production preceded the Los Angeles staging of Smokey Joe's Cafe. Sallid was subsequently credited with co-conceiving Smokey Joe's Cafe and providing additional musical staging for its Broadway production.

For the 69th Academy Awards in 1997, Sallid conceived, directed, and choreographed a dance number set to "That Thing You Do!". The performance featured 32 dancers selected from approximately 400 candidates. Academy Awards producer Gil Cates hired Sallid following a recommendation from Allen, citing his classical training, adventurous use of space, and the energy he brought to the production.

During the same period, Sallid and dance teacher Leah Bass led the Children's Dance Project, a ten-week workshop at Millikan Performing Arts Magnet in Sherman Oaks. The program offered low-cost professional training to teenage dancers and sought, in part, to prepare Black students for careers in dance.

After moving from Los Angeles to Atlanta in 2010, Sallid continued developing concert and theatrical work. He conceived James Brown: Get on the Good Foot—A Celebration in Dance, a 2013 national touring production developed with the Apollo Theater. Sallid selected 33 James Brown songs and assembled choreographers from several countries to interpret Brown's influence on contemporary culture.

His concert work continued with CHIAROSCURO: A Light in the Dark, created for the 2016 Modern Atlanta Dance Festival. The narrative contemporary ballet was performed by 13 Atlanta-based dancers.

Sallid later choreographed the 2022 Broadway revival of August Wilson's The Piano Lesson, directed by LaTanya Richardson Jackson and starring Samuel L. Jackson, John David Washington, and Danielle Brooks. Linda Armstrong of the New York Amsterdam News wrote that a scene featuring his choreography "brought the house down".

Sallid was the founding creative director of Damsel Atlanta, a cabaret supper club, in 2024. He also founded the Museum of African American Dance, a digital project that he said was intended to create a dedicated record of the work and history of Black dancers and choreographers. As of that year, he was choreographing the television series Tyler Perry's Young Dylan and developing two stage projects: a musical about boxer Joe Louis and Hidden Shange, about playwright Ntozake Shange.
