= Miss Prissy (dancer) =

American dancer

Miss Prissy (born Marquisa Gardner) is an American dancer known for the krumping style. She has been called The Queen of Krump.

She was one of the dancers featured in the 2005 film Rize, a documentary about krump dancing and clowning. She also starred in the 2005 music video for Madonna's Hung Up which topped the charts in over 30 countries. In 2012 she choreographed The Underground, a performance by 12 dancers to celebrate the 10th anniversary of the beginnings of krump, at the University of Southern California's Bovard Auditorium. Other film appearances include Alvin and the Chipmunks (2007).

Miss Prissy trained in classical ballet from the age of four, and was a cheerleader at school. She began to be called "Miss Prissy" because school-mates in "The Valley" were surprised that a girl from her "South Central" background was a ballet dancer and "so girly". She teaches krumping at a dance school in North Hollywood.
