= Casley =

Casley is a surname. Notable people with the surname include:

- Leonard Casley (1925–2019), founder of the Principality of Hutt River
- Jack Casley (1926–2014), English footballer
- Graeme Casley (born 1957), second and final monarch of Hutt River

== See also ==
- Casey (surname)
