= Krumping =

Type of street dance

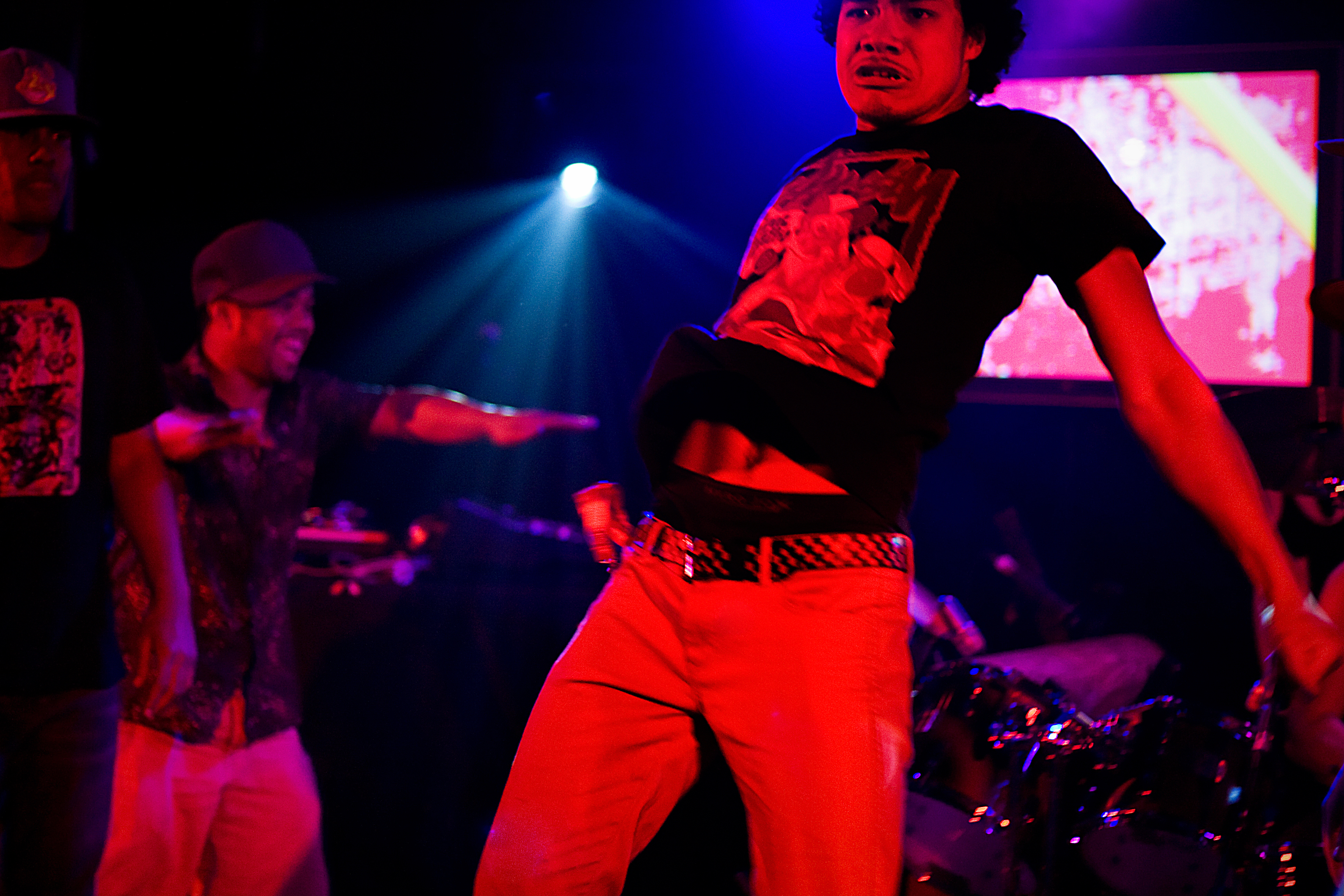
A krumper krumping in Australia

Krump is a type of dance culture that evolved through African-American street dancing popularized in the United States during the early 2000s, characterized by free, expressive, exaggerated, and highly energetic movement. The people who originated krumping saw the dance as a means for them to escape gang life.

== Origins ==
The root word krump came from the lyrics of a 1990 song and is sometimes explained as a backronym for Kingdom Radically Uplifted Mighty Praise, which presents krumping as a faith-based art form. Krumping was created by dancers: Ceasare "Tight Eyez" Willis, Marquisa "Miss Prissy" Gardner, Christopher "Lil' C" Toler and Jo'Artis "Big Mijo" Ratti in South Central, Los Angeles, during the early 2000s. Clowning is the less aggressive predecessor to krumping and was created in 1992 by Thomas "Tommy the Clown" Johnson in Compton, California.

In the 1990s, Johnson and his dancers—known as the Hip Hop Clowns—performed clowning for children's’ birthday parties and other general-public functions. In contrast, krumping focuses on highly-energetic battles and dramatic movements which Tommy the Clown describes as intense, fast-paced, and sharp. CBS News compared the intensity of krumping to that of moshing. Although krumping was not directly created by Tommy, it was inspired by his “clowning”. Originally, Willis and Ratti were clown dancers for Tommy, but as their dancing was considered too "rugged" and "raw" for clowning, they left and developed krumping. Tommy eventually opened a clown-dancing academy and started the Battle Zone competition at the Great Western Forum where krump crews and clown crews could come together and battle each other in front of an audience of their peers.

== Spread and influence ==
Expression is a must in krump because krump is expression. You have to let people feel what you're doing. You can't just come and get krump and your krump has no purpose.

— Robert "Phoolish" Jones;
Krump Kings

David LaChapelle's documentary, Rize, explores the clowning and krumping subculture in Los Angeles. He says of the movement: "What Nirvana was to rock-and-roll in the early '90s is what these kids are to hip-hop. It's the alternative to the bling-bling, tie-in-with-a-designer corporate hip-hop thing." LaChapelle was first introduced to krumping when he was directing Christina Aguilera's music video "Dirrty". After deciding to make a documentary about krumping, LaChapelle produced a short film titled Krumped, which was screened at the 2004 Aspen Shortsfest, and gained more funding to produce a longer version as a result of the positive response. In 2005, the longer version was released as Rize and screened at the Sundance Film Festival, the Auckland International Film Festival, and several other film festivals outside the United States.

Aside from Rize, krumping appeared in several music videos including Missy Elliott's "I'm Really Hot”, The Black Eyed Peas' "Hey Mama", Chemical Brothers' "Galvanize" and Madonna's "Hung Up". Krumping is also demonstrated in Skinny Puppy's "Pro-Test" video, and displays several other aspects of krumping.

Krumping has also appeared in the movies Bring It On: All or Nothing, Step Up, Stomp the Yard and Climax; the television series Community; and the reality dance competitions So You Think You Can Dance, Street Dance of China, and America's Best Dance Crew. Russell Ferguson. The original web series The Legion of Extraordinary Dancers also featured a krump dance in season one during the fifth episode, "The Lettermakers." It has also spawned "Marge Krumping", a 2016 meme taken from The Simpsons episode "Little Orphan Millie," where the character Marge tries to cheer up Bart by krumping, albeit unsuccessfully.

Krumping has since spread to many countries around the world.

== Style ==
There are five basic moves in krumping: stomps, jabs, chest pops, Buck hop, and arm swings. Krumping is rarely choreographed; it is almost entirely freestyle to a song (improvisational) and is danced most frequently in battles or sessions rather than on a stage. Krump is stylistically different from other hip-hop dance styles such as breaking and turfing. Krumping is very aggressive and is danced upright to upbeat and fast-paced music, but it does not promote aggression or fighting – moves are meant to take up space and challenge other dancers to feed off and return the energy, whereas breaking is more acrobatic and is danced on the floor to break beats. The Oakland dance style turfing is a fusion of popping and miming that incorporates storytelling and illusion. Krump is less precise, and more freestyle, than turfing. Thematically, all these dance styles align under the term street dance as they all share common attributes of their street origins, their freestyle nature and the use of battling.

== Vocabulary ==
- Battle: A direct dance competition often featuring concepts, materials, combos, and get-offs.
- Biter: Someone who attends sessions or watches battles in order to feed on others' styles and originality, so that they can mimic those moves later at another battle and pass them off as their own inventions, i.e. plagiarism.
- Session: When a group of krumpers form a semi-circle, or cypher in hip-hop context, and, one by one, go into the middle and freestyle.
- Buck: An adjective used to describe someone who excels in krump, as well as high-quality adherence to the tenets of the Krump ethos.
- Live: An adjective used to describe someone raising the energy in the session or battle.
- Call-out: A krumper's initiation or request for battle with another krumper.
- Lab: Deliberate experimentation by krumpers, either by themselves or with other krumpers, to create new concepts and/or advance their style.
- Get-off: A set of movements that determines that a krumper's round is over, usually a pattern consisting solely of foundations, bang-outs, or arm-swings.
- Kill-off: A set of movements that excites the crowd to the point where the battle is over and the crowd surrounds the krumper; the opponent is "killed off", hence the name.
- Krumper: A dancer who specializes in krumping.
- Krumpography: Krump used as a choreography.
- Concept: An abstract movement that helps krumpers tell a story.
- Material: A material movement krumpers use to show a random item to further storytelling, e.g. pouring water on the ground and slipping.
- Jab: A short, sharp, staccato movement of the arms. The krumper extends them from the chest outwards, and with the same energy, pulls it back.
- Stomp: Rhythmically driving the foot into and up from the ground in a way that the krumpers appear to get their energy from the ground itself.
- Chest pop: An upward motion of the chest in the same manner as breathing into the lungs; krumpers usually do chest pops to inhale while in a session or in a round.
- Arm swing: Moving an arm in a sweeping motion aided by gravity. There are two types of arm swings: small arm swings and big arm swings. Small arm swings are similar to the motions involved in pitching a baseball, while big arm swings are analogous to using the whole arm as a baseball bat.
- Praise Krump: The art of krumping set to religious songs.
- Storyline: A set of combos performed by krumpers to build up the hype and push the spazz meter to an appropriate moment for getting off or killing off their opponents.
- Hype: The intense feeling of being swept away; for example, if a krumper does buckness (see next section), carries out a unique dance move, or kills the music, the crowd is hyped up, thus leading to a kill-off. A common krump audience perception is that the hype comes from the krumpers' moves, but krumpers also get their hype and boost their spazz meter from the crowd.
- Spazz meter: A term used to determine the level or extent of the hype.
- Buck talk: The act of trash talking while in a Krump battle.

== Round storyline terminology ==
- Atmosphere: Feeling the vibe of the environment and having the environment feel the krumpers' presence.
- Intro: Starting one's rounds; usually with small movements, sometimes used to introduce a krumper's character or concept.
- Rounds: A set of combos, materials, concepts, and foundations taken together.
- Buckness: The part of the storyline where krumpers are already hyped up with their rounds, showing a series of heavy and/or fast movements; usually done with a stance of the knees slightly bent, while the arms and feet are moved far out in front of the lower extremities of the body.
- Krump: The part of the storyline where the krumper is doing a series of foundations, concepts, and materials while standing upright, while the arms and feet are moving in front of the upper extremities of the body.
- Liveness: The part of the storyline where the krumper is doing a series of foundations, concepts, and materials, with the body bent upward, while the arms and feet are moving outside of the body, either upwards or to the sides.
- Get-off: The part of the storyline where the krumper is expressing feelings most intensely, letting out by rapidly showing repetitive movements such as bang-outs, jabs and redundancy.
