= Paul Pellicoro =

American ballroom dancer

Paul Pellicoro (born 1956) is a professional ballroom dancer, instructor, and choreographer. He has owned and operated New York City's largest ballroom dance studio, Paul Pellicoro's DanceSport, since 1985, which is currently located next to the Empire State Building in Manhattan in New York City. The studio was previously located on the Upper West Side of Manhattan. Renowned for his work in film, Pellicoro has extensive film experience both as a performer and as a choreographer.

== Biography ==
Pellicoro first came to national attention as the dance choreographer for the film "Scent of a Woman" (1992), for which he trained Academy Award winner Al Pacino for the notable (and arguably, most memorable) scene of the film, wherein Pacino dances the Argentine Tango with actress Gabrielle Anwar.

Pellicoro both manages DanceSport and instructs full-time. Starting as an original Latin-Hustle street dancer during the late 1970's. Paul went on to train with the top English coaches to be a ten-dance International style competitor. He not only teaches International Latin American and Ballroom, but also the full American Style genre of dances. He is one of the few living experts in both "Authentic Style" dancing (such as Argentine Tango, Hustle and Salsa/Mambo) as well as the highly disciplined competitive styles you see in TV's "Dancing With The Stars". Among his notable students were Al Pacino, Robert De Niro, John Leguizamo, Mira Sorvino, Richard Gere, Wynona Ryder, Sigourney Weaver, Anthony LaPaglia, Jennifer Aniston, Paul Rudd, Brian Cox and Marilyn Cole.

In 1995, he co-founded the Partner Dance Educational Fund, a not-for-profit organization with a stated mission to bring partner dancing to a wider public. Currently, the Fund sponsors free dance workshops in New York City public schools and private spaces.

In 2002 Barricade Books published his book ″Paul Pellicoro on Tango: The Definitive Guide to Argentine Tango″.

== Filmography (crew) ==
Date	Film	Role
1992	Scent of a Woman	(choreographer)
1998	The Object of My Affection	(choreographer)
1999	Summer of Sam	(choreographer)
1999	Flawless	(choreographer)
2000	Autumn in New York	(choreographer)

== Publications ==
- ″Paul Pellicoro on Tango: The Definitive Guide to Argentine Tango″. Larchmont: Barricade 2002, ISBN 978-1569802205.
