= Morph (song) =

Twenty One Pilots song

Promotional single by Twenty One Pilots

from the album Trench
- Released: October 5, 2018
- Studio: United Recording Studios (Hollywood, California)
- Genre: R&B; soul; lounge jazz
- Length: 4:19
- Label: Fueled by Ramen
- Songwriters: Tyler Joseph, Paul Meany
- Producers: Tyler Joseph; Paul Meany (co.)

Twenty One Pilots promotional singles chronology
"My Blood" (2018)	"Morph" (2018)	"Chlorine" (2019)

"Morph" is a song written and recorded by American musical duo Twenty One Pilots from their fifth studio album, Trench (2018). It was released as a promotional single the same day as the album's release. It was produced by Joseph, with co-production from Paul Meany of Mutemath, and recorded at United Recording Studios in Hollywood, California.

The song received positive reviews from music critics, who lauded the production and Joseph's falsetto. It managed to achieve modest chart success in multiple countries, reaching number 54 in Ireland and number 67 in the United Kingdom.

== Background and writing ==
Like all of the songs from Trench, "Morph" was written by Tyler Joseph in a studio in his basement. In an interview with Music Feeds, Joseph explained his approach to writing their fifth studio album. According to Joseph, "It was written down in my studio, in my basement, so it was all at home. It was very close to the chest and I think that was important for us in following up." "Morph" features the use of bass guitar which is played by Joseph. During the interview, Joseph elaborated that he was quite inclined to reach for the instrument while writing the song and every other on Trench, saying how just like when he taught himself how to play the piano, he discovered a sense of inspiration and excitement in the bass guitar. During an AMA, Joseph and Dun gave answers to questions submitted on reddit, delving into the story of Trench while providing their favorite songs. It was revealed that "Morph" was one of the four songs that were the hardest for Joseph to write. According to Joseph, "The opening riff of 'Morph' and the production on 'The Hype' took everything out of me."

Trench was billed a something of sequel to the saga of Blurryface, and has lyrics that retain connections between seemingly random references. Their fifth album was concept album that featured an overarching storyline, with songs containing themes involving a world called "Trench". However, "Morph" is one of the less conceptual parts of the album and lacks symbolic origin stories. Though the entire album does not tell one conceptual narrative from start to finish, it still reveals more about the world surrounding Trench and the city called "Dema". One of the key discoveries comes early in Trench at track three with "Morph". During the song, listeners learn the identity of Nico, the titular character of "Nico and the Niners" and one of the nine bishops, as well as one of Joseph's key antagonists in this narrative. Within "Morph", Joseph references the alias for a member of a group of French mathematicians that originated during the mid-1930s. He is referred to simply as Nico both in the track and subsequently in "Nico and the Niners", in which a renegade group fights against a mysterious, nefarious organization known as Dema. His full name is Nicolas Bourbaki, which is the collective pseudonym for the mathematicians who invented the notation for the empty set — the Ø symbol used in much of the branding for Twenty One Pilots over the past years.

Similar to previous albums, dark themes remained throughout Trench as Twenty One Pilots continued exploring topics of insecurity, mental health and death. While other songs feel like side quests within its main storyline, the major narrative throughout the album's entirety was the void between being in one's darkest moments and making it through the other side. "Morph" stands among the songs from Trench that contain prosocial content, where the tension between anxiety and hope emerges. On "Morph", the duo attempts to come to terms and reckon with the reality of death.

== Recording ==
"Morph" was produced by Joseph, while co-produced by record producer Paul Meany of the band Mutemath, and recorded at United Recording Studios in Hollywood, California. The track was mixed by Adam Hawkins and mastered by Chris Gehringer at Sterling Sound Studios in New York City. Twenty One Pilots recorded songs for Trench at United Recording Studios and chose to collaborate with record producer and audio engineer Darrell Thorp. As always, Twenty One Pilots experimented with a rotation of music genres, translating funky, Californian R&B into "Morph." It was bolstered by sleek, wide-ranging record production assisted by Meany.

The track is one of many on Trench that condenses disparate musical elements into a less definable but easily recognizable sound, with much of the album opting for slick, atmospheric production. Their fifth studio album continued vocalist Joseph and drummer Josh Dun's genre-warping hallmark of attacking various styles while showcasing a flair for songwriting. On Trench, Joseph and Dun again schemed familiar measures from the duo's fourth studio album Blurryface (2015), including reggae textures, ukulele bases, and paranoid raps, alongside new developments. Though their trademark cross-genre, dub-influenced sounds remained, Twenty One Pilots expanded their range with some new techniques, scattering content such as Joseph's falsetto into "Morph", which contains washes of R&B. The track was equipped with R&B hooks similar to "Heavydirtysoul" from their previous album. Alongside bass guitar, Twenty One Pilots blended horn sections and electric piano into the record. "Morph" also deploys accelerated breakbeats and jolting left turns while demonstrating how much Dun had become a virtuoso percussionist.

== Composition ==
"Morph"
"Morph" is a blissful lounge jazz song that boasts falsetto R&B hooks. Lyrically, the duo mesh twenty-first century depression and a moral lesson about being caught in a holding pattern in life while reckoning as they reality of death. The song expounds on how Joseph will keep distracted, moving forward and continue "morphing" to prevent from wallowing in isolation.

"Morph" is a lounge jazz song that runs for a duration of four minutes and nineteen seconds. It is a blissful number that boasts falsetto R&B hooks with summery soul. The song features horn sections and electric piano, with showers of falsettos from Joseph being injected into washes of funky R&B. The ambient track has a slick atmosphere and utilizes rapid, funky breakbeats as well as jolting left turns, while demonstrating both restraint and Dun's virtuosic percussion. According to the sheet music published at Musicnotes.com by Alfred Publishing Co., Inc, it is composed in the key of C♯ minor and set in the time signature of common time, with a tempo of 90 beats per minute.

Lyrically, the duo incorporate twenty-first century depression and "Morph" harbors a moral lesson about how being caught in a holding pattern in life — not being dead but not truly feeling alive either — isn't an aspiration. "Morph" questions what takes place after death while attempting to come to terms with the reality of death: "Can't stop thinking about if and when I'll die/For now I see that 'if' and 'when' are truly different cries." Nevertheless, they acknowledge that death must be reckoned with: "We're surrounded and we're hounded/There's no 'above,' or 'under' or 'around' it." At the song's chorus, Joseph recites the commonly misheard lyric, "What they throw at me's too slow." The song also talks about the temptation to change in order to please others, "I'll morph to someone else/Defense mechanism mode." The sounds that Joseph makes during the chorus provide a double meaning to its titular line about "morphing to someone else." "Morph" expounds on how Joseph will keep himself distracted and moving forward, and continue "morphing" so he does not wallow in isolation. He ponders over the ones and zeros transmitting messages to him, contemplating if anyone is listening. It appears as if Joseph is acknowledging coding in the music that only those who have faced similar struggles can truly "hear". Additionally, he brings forth a call to courage: "What are we here for/If not to run straight through all our tormentors?"

== Critical reception ==
Regarding it among the "fresh tricks" found on Trench, AllMusic's Neil Z. Yeung complimented Joseph's "surprise" use of falsetto on the track. Mark Kennedy of USA Today characterized "Morph" as being "blissed-out and terrific." NME writer Gary Ryan considered the song an example of how, "As ever, they play spin the bottle with genre... This is buoyed by sleek, widescreen production." Citing it as an album highlight, Billboard's Chris Payne stated the track "deploys rapid-fire breakbeats and jarring left turns that recall the Prodigy and DJ Shadow, suggesting what a virtuoso percussionist Dun has become." Chris Willman for Variety advised, "take my recommendation and forget about the most deeply conceptual parts of this concept album — which just seems like a lot of work — and enjoy the many parts of Trench that don't require a thirst for symbolic origin stories. There are plenty of these, like 'Morph'... which sport falsetto R&B hooks, somewhat in the tradition of the previous album's best track, 'Heavydirtysoul.'" Stereogum's Chris DeVille asserted, "'Morph' sounds like the Odelay version of Maroon 5." Joshua Copperman from PopMatters opined, "Restraint isn't a bad fit for them. Possible future single 'Morph' sounds like a Khalid song on its chorus, giving the titular line about 'morphing to someone else' a double meaning and considering this group, that's likely intentional." Mike Breen for Cincinnati CityBeat referred to the track as one of the album's "ambient ear-grabbers." Kerrang!'s Emily Carter cites "Morph" as an example of the scrutiny towards finer details displayed on Trench, sharing how she was drawn in by the song's "dark honesty." Writing for The Times-Picayune/The New Orleans Advocate, Keith Spera cited "Morph" as one of the songs where "the influence of rock-rap-reggae hybrid band 311 was evident." Jason Pettigrew, for Alternative Press, remarked, "In a little over four minutes, the duo successfully mix '70s lounge jazz (with horn sections and electric piano) and disco-era Bee Gees falsettos with 21st century depression."

== Commercial performance ==
In the United States, "Morph" peaked at number nine on the U.S. Billboard Hot Rock & Alternative Songs chart for the date issued October 20, 2018. The song also peaked at number six on the U.S. Billboard Bubbling Under Hot 100 for the same date issued, spending one week on the chart. In the United Kingdom, "Morph" entered the UK Singles Chart at number sixty-seven for the week of October 12, 2018 before falling out.

== Live performances ==
Twenty One Pilots provided a live rendition of "Morph" for the fifteenth consecutive sold-out concert at The BB&T Center in Sunrise, Florida during their Bandito Tour. During the performance, Josh Dun played a miniature version of his drum kit while being held aloft on a platform by fans. Twenty One Pilots performed "Morph" during their second headlining appearance at the Smoothie King Center in New Orleans, Louisiana on June 19, 2019. The multi-dimensional concert featured Joseph wearing a ski mask. Several fans in the audience wore yellow, which was the dominant color scheme for Trench and the duo's The Bandito Tour, in contrast to the previous red color scheme. The band's concerts in Vancouver and Boston featured a drum mashup of "Morph" and "Seven Nation Army" by the White Stripes.

== Credits and personnel ==
Credits adapted from the liner notes of Trench and Tidal.

- Tyler Joseph – lead vocals, piano, synthesizers, guitar, bass guitar, programming, production, songwriting
- Josh Dun – drums, percussion, backing vocals, trumpet
- Paul Meany – co-production, programming, keyboards, synthesizers, songwriting
- Adam Hawkins – audio mixing
- Chris Gehringer – audio mastering

== Charts ==
Chart performance for "Morph"
Chart (2018)	Peak position
Ireland (IRMA)	54
Lithuania (AGATA)	20
New Zealand Hot Singles (RMNZ)	11
Portugal (AFP)	83
Sweden Heatseekers (Sverigetopplistan)	10
UK Singles (Official Charts)	67
US Bubbling Under Hot 100 (Billboard)	6
US Hot Rock & Alternative Songs (Billboard)	9

== Certifications ==
Certifications for "Morph"
Region	Certification	Certified units/sales
Canada (Music Canada)	Gold	40,000^{‡}
United States (RIAA)	Gold	500,000^{‡}
^{‡} Sales+streaming figures based on certification alone.
