= Trench (album) =

Studio album by Twenty One Pilots
- Released: October 5, 2018
- Recorded: 2017–2018
- Studios: Tyler Joseph's home studio (Columbus, Ohio); United Recording Studios (Hollywood, California)
- Genres: Alternative rock; rap rock; electropop; pop rock; R&B; trip hop
- Length: 56:04
- Labels: Fueled by Ramen; Elektra
- Producers: Tyler Joseph; Paul Meany

Twenty One Pilots chronology
Blurryface (2015)	Trench (2018)	Scaled and Icy (2021)

Singles from Trench
- 1. "Jumpsuit/Nico and the Niners" Released: July 11, 2018; 2. "Levitate" Released: August 8, 2018; 3. "My Blood" Released: August 27, 2018; 4. "Chlorine" Released: January 22, 2019; 5. "The Hype" Released: July 16, 2019

Trench is the fifth studio album by the American musical duo Twenty One Pilots, released on October 5, 2018, through Fueled by Ramen and Elektra Records. It was the band's first studio album in three years, after the breakthrough success of their previous studio album, Blurryface (2015). Recorded in secret during a year-long public silence, it is a concept album which explores mental health, suicide, and doubt themes prominently featured in the band's previous works, framed in the metaphorical city of Dema and the surrounding continent known as "Trench". The album was also the first release of the newly revived Elektra Music Group.

The album was preceded by the release of four singles. The first two, "Jumpsuit" and "Nico and the Niners", were both released on July 11, 2018. The third single, "Levitate", was released on August 8, 2018. The fourth single, "My Blood", was released on August 27, 2018. Two follow-up singles, "Chlorine" and "The Hype", were released on January 22 and July 16, 2019, respectively. To promote the album, the band embarked on the Bandito Tour, which debuted at the Bridgestone Arena in Nashville, Tennessee on October 16, 2018, and concluded at the Aragon Ballroom in Chicago, Illinois on December 13, 2019.

Trench received acclaim from critics, who praised its ambition, songwriting and cohesive production; many contrasted it favorably with Blurryface. Several publications placed the record on their year-end lists of 2018, with Rock Sound naming it the best album of the year. It was also a commercial success, reaching number one in six countries, including Australia, New Zealand, Spain and the Netherlands, and number two in several countries, notably the United Kingdom and United States.

== Background and production ==
Twenty One Pilots released their fourth studio album, Blurryface, on May 17, 2015. The album topped the Billboard 200 and produced two top five singles, "Stressed Out" and "Ride", peaking at number two and number five respectively on the Billboard Hot 100. These songs, along with the single "Heathens" from the Suicide Squad soundtrack, launched the band into mainstream success in 2016. The duo embarked on two concert tours in support of the album from 2015 to 2017. In an interview with Alternative Press, the band stated that they would be "going dark" in order to focus on new music, and added that they would focus on the lyrical content and bring back the "authenticity, lyrics, delivery, and fearlessness of songwriting" of their self-titled debut album. Following the five final dates of the band's tour, "Tour De Columbus", the duo entered a year-long break from public appearances beginning on July 6, 2017, in order to rest and work on their next project.

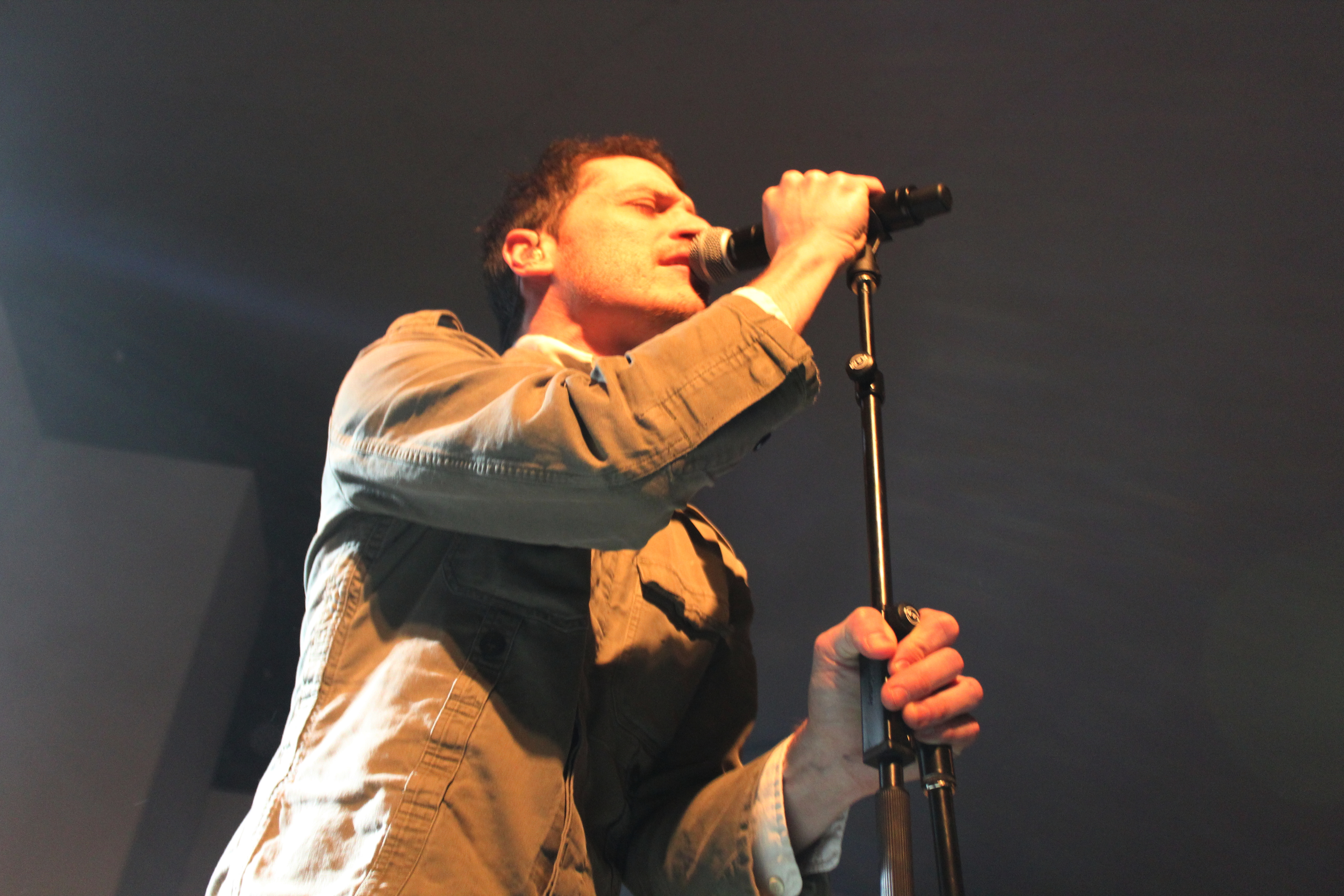
Paul Meany, singer and keyboardist of the alternative rock band Mutemath, co-wrote and co-produced much of the project alongside frontman Tyler Joseph.

The conceptual world of "Trench" was created before the songs from the album had been written, departing from the band's regular songwriting process where they would create the album song by song. It is unclear when production of Trench began; however, lead singer Tyler Joseph was working on the track "Bandito" as early as 2015, during the Blurryface Tour. Joseph produced the album's fourteen tracks within his private home studio, while Josh Dun's drum tracks were recorded at United Recording Studios. Mutemath frontman and keyboardist Paul Meany co-produced and co-wrote much of the project, following his previous collaboration with Twenty One Pilots for the TOPxMM remix EP and on the Emotional Roadshow World Tour. Adam Hawkins mixed the album. The album's "drop dead due date to get ahead of production and distribution" was August 15, 2018, less than two months before the release of the album.

No one other than Joseph, Dun, and Meany were involved in the songwriting process for the album in order to eliminate any effect a family member, friend or colleague could have on the final form of the record's content through their comments. In an interview with Kerrang!, Joseph explained that he only showed these people the album when it was finished so that their reaction would be "as close to their true reaction as possible." In a later interview with The New York Times, he recounted how the project "almost destroyed" him, leading him to consider ending all work on it, as his emotional state "whiplashed" between self-deprecation and self-confidence.

== Concept and music ==
Trench continues the band's exploration of themes surrounding insecurity, faith, suicide, and mental health, prominent themes on Twenty One Pilots' previous albums. The album was formed around the conceptual world of "Trench", created by Joseph and represented through the album's accompanying marketing and music videos.

Much of the album and its marketing material discusses the city of "Dema", a fictional location set within Trench that draws its name from dakhma, or "Tower of Silence", in Zoroastrianism. In that religion, Towers of Silence were used to dispose of dead bodies by having vultures eat the corpses. The band explained on Reddit that they were inspired by the "sad and intriguing concept of a dying religion... the reason it was dying was something they could never control: The lack of the vultures needed to carry out their theology. Something so natural and logistical can get in the way of your religion."

Last record, Blurryface was a character that represented insecurity, and the more you learn about those insecurities and the more you learn about that character, the more control that you can have over things like that in your mental game of war. With this record being a continuation of that, one of the things that I knew I wanted to do was to figure out Blurryface's real name, and Blurryface's real name is Nicolas Bourbaki.

— Tyler Joseph, speaking to Music Feeds

Trench's city, Dema, is ruled by nine "bishops", whose names are Nico (full name Nicolas Bourbaki, based on a collective pseudonym of a group of mainly French mathematicians), Andre, Lisden, Keons, Reisdro, Sacarver, Nills, Vetomo, and Listo. The chief bishop, Nico, was revealed by Joseph to be Blurryface, the personification of his insecurities from their previous album of the same name. Other characters involved are part of a group who call themselves the "Banditos", whose aim is to liberate the people of Dema. They adopt the color yellow, specifically 0xFCE300, which the bishops are unable to see, instead seeing it as grey.

The album, like Twenty One Pilots' previous records, contains many different genres of music, including alternative rock, rap rock, electropop. pop rock, R&B, trip hop, and reggae. It opens with the alternative and hard rock song containing progressive rock and nu metal hooks, "Jumpsuit". Lyrically it is about dealing with Joseph's insecurities. It was described by Rolling Stone as having "distorted bass guitar, crisp drumming and dark washes of synth" with Joseph's vocals building from "a near-whisper to a full-throated scream, to an atmospheric falsetto." The song's outro merges into the next track, "Levitate", a minimalist rap rock track. "Morph" is a fusion of jazz, rock, rap, and reggae. It explores the themes of life after death and references the leading bishop, Nico. The song has been compared to artists such as Khalid, the Prodigy, Beck and DJ Shadow. The following track, "My Blood", is an indie pop and rock song about remaining loyal to a friend. The track has been compared to songs such as Foster the People's "Pumped Up Kicks" and Portugal. The Man's "Feel It Still" due to the song's chorus featuring a falsetto sung by Joseph. "Chlorine" is a song about “cleansing your mind from dark thoughts.” "Smithereens" is a "cute and playful" song about Joseph's love for his wife, Jenna, whom he married in 2015.

The next song, "Neon Gravestones", is a "slow-burning" rap song building over a 6/8 piano riff with electronic percussion being added as the song progresses. Lyrically, the track explores suicide and its glorification by the media and ends with a plea to admire those who have gone through life, not those who have chosen an earlier grave. "The Hype" is an alternative rock chant-along with a ukulele bridge. In an interview with Coup de Main Magazine, Joseph says the song is about the difference between internal and external pressure. The next track, "Nico and the Niners", is a song fusing reggae, rap, rock and psychedelia that is about resisting the "bishops", a theme found in "Doubt", a song from the previous album, denouncing their religion, "Vialism", and leaving Dema. "Cut My Lip" is about the willingness to persevere even when times are hard, and also discusses Joseph's struggle between staying true to himself and giving into the demands of the music industry.

The following track, "Bandito", is a piano-heavy ballad with mysterious minimal electronics that sees the protagonist accepting his role as part of the Banditos, a group of rebels. It contains the lyric "Sahlo Folina", which is an anagram that, when unscrambled, reads "all Ohio fans". The track has been compared to the work of Alt-J. "Pet Cheetah" is a song that blends the rap, techno and rock genres and is a metaphor for the songwriting process and writer's block. "Legend" is a tribute to Joseph's grandfather, Robert, who died on March 17, 2018. He was featured on the right-hand side of the album cover for the band's 2013 label-debut release, Vessel. The final track, "Leave the City", features slightly restrained vocals, a strong piano segment, and light drumming. The song is about losing faith, reflecting Joseph's struggles with his Christian beliefs. It does not build up to a complete crescendo and intentionally leaves the song feeling slightly incomplete. Joseph explains this as representing the concept that "Trench" is a journey between one place (Dema) and whatever comes next, which mirrors how mental illness is an ongoing struggle that one needs to keep working at.

The narrative and characters of the album were expanded upon in Scaled and Icy (2021) and Clancy (2024), and concluded with Breach (2025).

== Release and promotion ==
Twenty One Pilots first mentioned Dema, the fictional city created by the band, during the 2017 Alternative Press Music Awards when they won the award for Most Dedicated Fanbase. Josh Dun collected the award alone and apologized for Tyler Joseph's absence, mentioning that Joseph was "severing ties with Dema", hinting that he was working on an ongoing project. On April 21, 2018, fans discovered the URL dmaorg.info hidden in a GIF on the band's webstore. This site consisted of a series of cryptic teasers centered around Dema.

The website also contained many journal entries from Clancy, a fictional character and the protagonist in the band's conceptual world. The journal was about his escape from Dema, with entries periodically added over time. On July 6, following a journal entry promising that "by morning, everything will be different", the band sent an e-mail containing a GIF of a slightly opened eye to fans who subscribed to their newsletter. The band returned to social media on July 9, 2018, with a video of a more opened yellow eye. Billboards and murals emblazoned with the band's new logo were put up in numerous cities around the world overnight. The next day, the band posted another video of the eye, more open than before, with a muffled version of the intro to "Jumpsuit" playing. The song, as well as a second single, "Nico and the Niners" were eventually released on July 11. The same day, the band announced the title of the album as Trench and revealed its release date. The track list for the album was revealed the next month.

Upon the end of the band's hiatus, Josh Dun was interviewed by Hanuman Welch of Beats 1 about the album's writing process and the band's two new singles. On September 5, 2018, Zane Lowe, also of Beats 1, hosted an interview with band member Tyler Joseph in his home studio in Columbus, Ohio, to speak about the band's year-long hiatus, the album, and how it reflected his struggles with insecurity, spirituality, and mental health.

On September 14, 2018, Twenty One Pilots announced on Twitter that they would be releasing a yellow colored vinyl LP exclusive to their online store. They also announced that they would be releasing 15,000 copies of the LP in olive green through Indie Retail and 8,000 copies of the LP in olive green and yellow on the Urban Outfitters website. It was announced that the band would appear in various record stores across the United Kingdom during the European leg of the Bandito Tour.

On October 2, 2018, several copies of the album were accidentally sold in a record store in Australia and the record was subsequently illegally leaked. Josh Dun hosted a livestream on Instagram with Tyler Joseph the following day to promote the album and addressed this leak. The album was released at midnight two days later, accompanied by a music video for "My Blood". The album was also the first release of the newly revived Elektra Music Group. The band uploaded a spoof poster of the 2018 film A Star Is Born on their Twitter account, replacing Bradley Cooper and Lady Gaga with themselves in a bid to defeat the film's soundtrack album in terms of sales. In December 2018, the band partnered with music streaming service Spotify to create an immersive video experience exploring the world of "Trench", which also revealed the meaning of the five symbols featured on the album cover underneath the track listing.

On June 21, 2019, the duo launched their Location Sessions series, which features live renditions of tracks from Trench. The first track to be released was an acoustic version of "Chlorine", named "Chlorine (19.4326° N, 99.1332° W)", with the coordinates following the song title pointing to a square in Mexico City. A reworked live performance of "Cut My Lip" was released on July 11 as the second song shared from the series.

Ahead of the album's release, the band was featured on the cover of Rock Sound magazine's September issue, Alternative Press magazine's September issue, and Kerrang! magazine's October issue, all containing an interview with the band and exclusive photographs. Following the album's release, Caryn Ganz, writing for The New York Times, interviewed Joseph and Dun about the band's history and the album's creation.

=== Singles ===
On July 11, 2018, the band released the first two singles, "Jumpsuit" and "Nico and the Niners", as well as a music video for "Jumpsuit". On July 25, 2018, a music video for "Nico and the Niners" was released, as the second of a trilogy of videos centered on the fictional world of Trench. Both videos feature references to the videos of previous songs, including "Heavydirtysoul" and "Stressed Out", with the repeated imagery of a burning car for the former and an elaborate handshake by Joseph and Dun for the latter.

The third single off the album, "Levitate", was leaked onto the streaming platform Tidal prior to its official release in August, only to quickly be removed. The song was subsequently released the next day as the album's third single via Zane Lowe's Beats 1 show as the day's "World Record", accompanied by the album's official track listing. A music video was also released, concluding the trilogy.

On August 20, 2018, at the VMAs, a ten-second long snippet of the song "My Blood" was played at the end of a commercial promoting the album. On August 27, 2018, a Twitter user leaked the full song onto his Twitter account in low quality, after they found that it could be played on their Apple HomePod. The leak was confirmed real when the band made the song available on streaming services later that day, as the album's fourth single. A music video for the song premiered on YouTube the day of the album's release. On January 22, 2019, the track "Chlorine" was released as the album's fifth single and was accompanied by a music video. "The Hype" was sent to US alternative radio on July 16, 2019, as the sixth and final single from the album, with its music video released on July 26.

== Tour ==
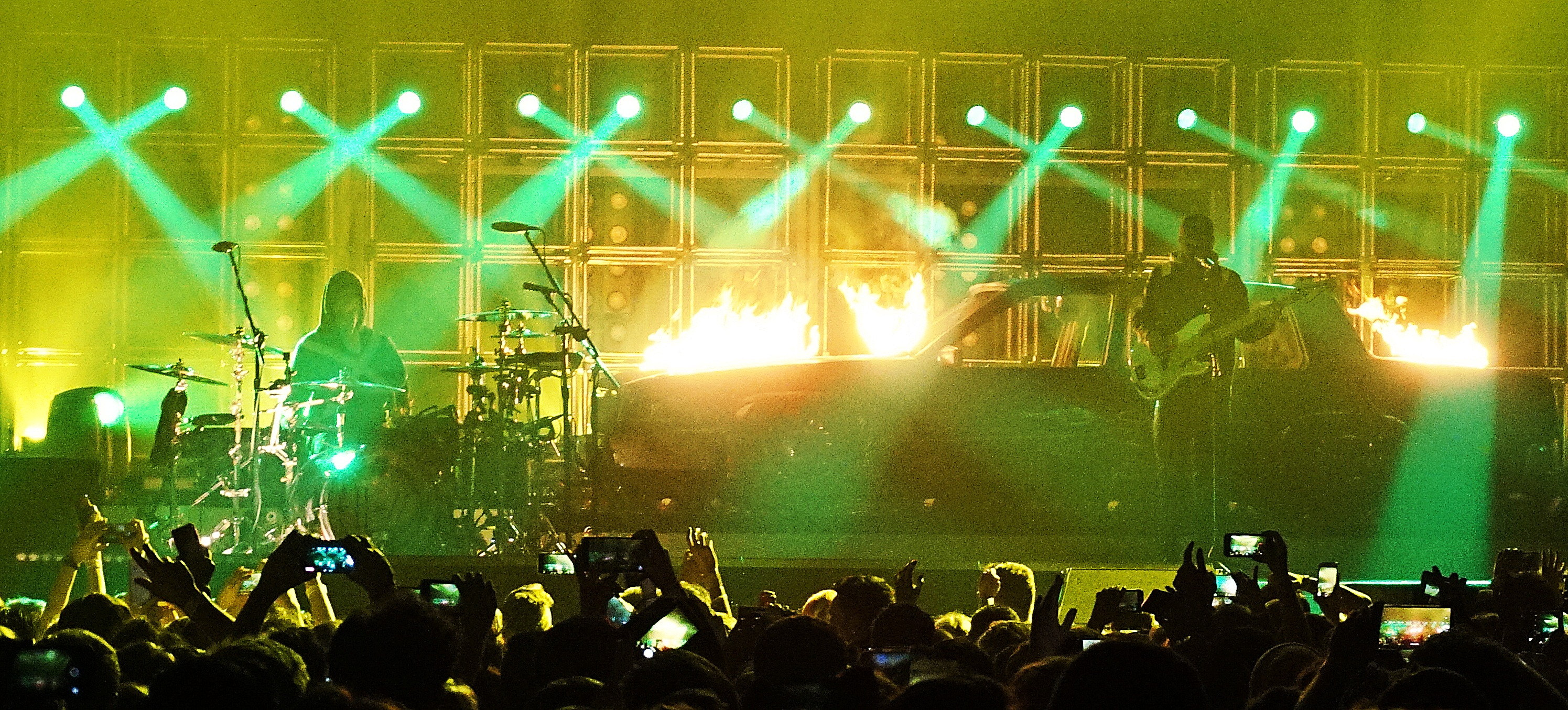
Twenty One Pilots performing in 2019

The day of the release of "Jumpsuit", the band announced that a concert tour in support of the album, titled "The Bandito Tour", would begin on October 16, 2018. It was later revealed that Awolnation and Max Frost would perform as the opening act for the first North American leg of the tour.

On August 19, 2018, Twenty One Pilots released an unlisted YouTube video promoting a concert at the Brixton Academy in London; the concert was titled "A Complete Diversion", a reference to a line from the song "Nico and the Niners" ("And start a concert, a complete diversion"). The concert took place on September 12, 2018, less than a month before the scheduled release date of the album.

The first North American leg of the tour started in Nashville, Tennessee on October 18, 2018, less than two weeks after the album was released. After North America, shows continued in Australia and Europe, as well as several festivals in South America. A second North American leg ending on June 30, 2019, was added to the tour, including shows in Mexico and Canada as well as two shows in the band's hometown, Columbus. This was followed by a series of prominent festival headlining performances in North America and Europe ending on December 13, 2019, and by a third North American leg ending on November 9, 2019.

== Commercial performance ==
Trench became Twenty One Pilots' first number one album in Australia, debuting atop the ARIA Albums Chart on October 13. It also debuted at number one in New Zealand, Spain, Portugal, Czech Republic, Mexico, and the Netherlands.

Trench debuted at number two on the US Billboard 200 behind the soundtrack for A Star Is Born, with 175,000 album-equivalent units, of which 135,000 were pure album sales. This marked the band's biggest sales week in the country until Breach (2025), surpassing their number one album Blurryface. It is the band's second US top three album. The album then dipped to number 7 in its second week with 49,000 units. The album debuted at number one on the Top Rock Albums and Alternative Albums charts, and every song from the album charted in the top 25 of the US Hot Rock Songs chart. The album also debuted at number two on the Canadian Albums Chart with 11,000 album-equivalent units. The album was leading the UK midweek charts upon its release with 6,000 combined sales, but debuted number two on the UK Albums Chart with 29,835 copies (including 6,178 sales equivalent streams), almost 2,000 behind the soundtrack album A Star Is Born, making it the band's highest-charting album to date in the country. It also became the band's highest-charting album in Ireland, Scotland, Finland, and Norway, debuting at number two in these countries. In France, the album debuted at number nine on the SNEP Albums Chart, selling 6,400 units. In the US, Trench was certified Platinum on May 14, 2020.

By January 3, 2019, 7,000 cassette copies of Trench had been sold in the US, making it the third most sold cassette album of 2018 behind Guardians of the Galaxy: Awesome Mix Vol. 1 and Guardians of the Galaxy Vol 2: Awesome Mix Vol. 2, and making a major contribution to the 23% rise in cassette sales in the US in 2018.

== Reception ==
=== Critical reception ===
Professional ratings
Aggregate scores
Source	Rating
Metacritic	81/100
Review scores
Source	Rating
AllMusic	4.5/5 stars
Dead Press!	10/10 stars
Gig Soup	79%
Hot Press	7/10
Kerrang!	4/5
NME	4/5 stars
PopMatters	7/10 stars
Rolling Stone	3.5/5 stars
The Spill Magazine	4/5
Sputnikmusic	4.5/5

According to the review aggregator Metacritic, Trench received "universal acclaim" based on a weighted average score of 81 out of 100 from 6 critic scores.

David McLaughlin of Kerrang! found the band to be "at their most personal and creatively daring best," praising the album's songwriting, ambition, catchiness and accessibility. Gary Ryan of NME described the record as "the sound of a band ratcheting up the ambition without ever being pulled down by an undertow of pretentiousness," adding that "it's more low-key than Blurryface, but ultimately more rewarding;" he also opined that though "the narrative... doesn't overwhelm," Joseph's songwriting is "most affecting when he steps beyond any concept straight-jacket." Neil Z. Yeung acclaimed the album's introspective lyrics in his review for AllMusic, summarizing that "although Trench requires a few spins to really register, it's ultimately rewarding and fully immersive, delivering a depth and gravity at which Twenty One Pilots only hinted on Blurryface." Vicki Mahony of The Spill Magazine praised the album's darker themes and more mature sound compared to Blurryface, and further commended its "outstanding" production and "dynamic sound."

Billboard writer Chris Payne considered Trench "surprisingly cohesive" and complimented its "outstanding sequencing and production continuity," concluding that it "matches the stakes of Blurryface and all its demon-conquering, genre-blurring catharsis, while raising it one on the sonic universe holding it all together." Similarly, Rolling Stone's Christopher Weingarten stated that the array of genres and ideas found on Blurryface had "coalesced into a smarter, more mature whole" on Trench, additionally noting its "more cohesive sound and feel" and the duo's growth "as songwriters and arrangers." Joshua Copperman of PopMatters expressed similar opinions, claiming that "the album hangs together thanks to an increased maturity in the thematic content and production," but had mixed feelings towards its musical restraint: although he considered it "not a bad fit" for the band, it occasionally "leads to lesser versions of the kinds of music they normally do well." Conversely, Damon Taylor of Dead Press wrote that "a plethora of influences are splashed across the record, giving their core sound a new distinction," and additionally praised Dun's drumming, writing that he "pushes the pace of each track with reserve and intensity in equal measure."

David Hayter of 411 Mania considered that "mythos laden concept album Trench might struggle to consistently fire on all cylinders, but the good far out weighs the bad, making for a thoughtful and sonically daring experience." Chris Willman, writing for Variety, found the album to be at its best when the songs "ditch the characters and concept and just have Joseph directly saying what he means," adding: "take my recommendation and forget about the most deeply conceptual parts of this concept album — which just seems like a lot of work — and enjoy the many parts of Trench that don't require a thirst for symbolic origin stories." Conversely, Stephen Keegan of Hot Press opined that "in today's 'stan culture', Joseph's clever breadcrumbing of lyrical clues allows fans to bond over their shared community – and will have obsessives debating on Genius.com for months." GIG Soup wrote highly positively of the album's "personal" songwriting, claiming that "Twenty One Pilots are discussing topics others are afraid to, and they are doing it right." Tyler White of Sputnikmusic wrote, "Twenty One Pilots levitate to a higher level of musical maturity."

=== Accolades ===
Year-end lists
Publication	Accolade	Rank	Ref.
Alternative Press	The 50 Best Albums of 2018	—N/a	
Billboard	The 50 Best Albums of 2018	34	
Billboard	The 25 Best Rock Albums of 2018	4	
iHeartRadio	Top 10 ALT Albums of 2018	—N/a	
Kerrang!	The 50 Albums that Shook 2018	21	
Rock Sound	Rock Sound's Best Albums of 2018	1	

== Track listing ==
All tracks are written by Tyler Joseph, except where noted.

Trench track listing
No.	Title	Writer(s)	Length
1.	"Jumpsuit"		3:58
2.	"Levitate"	Joseph; Paul Meany	2:25
3.	"Morph"	Joseph; Meany	4:19
4.	"My Blood"		3:49
5.	"Chlorine"	Joseph; Meany	5:24
6.	"Smithereens"	Joseph; Meany	2:57
7.	"Neon Gravestones"		4:00
8.	"The Hype"		4:25
9.	"Nico and the Niners"		3:45
10.	"Cut My Lip"	Joseph; Meany	4:43
11.	"Bandito"	Joseph; Meany	5:31
12.	"Pet Cheetah"	Joseph; Meany	3:18
13.	"Legend"		2:53
14.	"Leave the City"		4:40
Total length:			56:04

Triplet EP (10" vinyl)
No.	Title	Writer(s)	Length
1.	"Jumpsuit"		3:58
2.	"Levitate"	Joseph; Meany	2:25
3.	"Nico and the Niners"		3:45
Total length:			10:11

== Personnel ==
Twenty One Pilots

- Tyler Joseph – lead vocals, bass, guitar, piano, programming, keyboards, synthesizers, organs, ukulele, production, songwriting
- Josh Dun – drums, percussion, trumpet, drum engineering, backing vocals

Additional musicians

- Paul Meany – synthesizers, programming, keyboards, production, songwriting, backing vocals

Additional personnel

- Chris Gehringer – mastering
- Adam Hawkins – mixing
- Brad Heaton – photography and illustrating
- Brian Ranney – packaging
- Brandon Rike – creative director, design
- Chris Woltman – executive producer

Recording

- Published by Warner-Tamerlane publishing Corp. (BMI) and Stryker Joseph Music (BMI)
- Recorded at Tyler Joseph's home studio (Columbus, Ohio) and United Recording Studios (Hollywood, California)
- Mastered at Sterling Sound (New York, New York)

== Charts ==
=== Weekly charts ===
Weekly chart performance for Trench
Chart (2018)	Peak position
Australian Albums (ARIA)	1
Austrian Albums (Ö3 Austria)	3
Belgian Albums (Ultratop Flanders)	7
Belgian Albums (Ultratop Wallonia)	5
Canadian Albums (Billboard)	2
Czech Albums (ČNS IFPI)	1
Danish Albums (Hitlisten)	22
Dutch Albums (Album Top 100)	1
Finnish Albums (Suomen virallinen lista)	2
French Albums (SNEP)	13
German Albums (Offizielle Top 100)	4
Greek Albums (IFPI)	6
Hungarian Albums (MAHASZ)	9
Icelandic Albums (Tónlistinn)	26
Irish Albums (IRMA)	2
Italian Albums (FIMI)	5
Japan Hot Albums (Billboard Japan)	73
Japanese Albums (Oricon)	75
Lithuanian Albums (AGATA)	1
Mexican Albums (AMPROFON)	1
New Zealand Albums (RMNZ)	1
Norwegian Albums (VG-lista)	2
Polish Albums (ZPAV)	7
Portuguese Albums (AFP)	1
Scottish Albums (Official Charts)	2
Slovak Albums (ČNS IFPI)	3
Spanish Albums (PROMUSICAE)	1
Swedish Albums (Sverigetopplistan)	5
Swiss Albums (Schweizer Hitparade)	4
UK Albums (Official Charts)	2
US Billboard 200	2
US Top Alternative Albums (Billboard)	1
US Top Rock Albums (Billboard)	1
US Indie Store Album Sales (Billboard)	1

=== Year-end charts ===
Year-end chart performance for Trench
Chart (2018)	Position
Australian Albums (ARIA)	70
Belgian Albums (Ultratop Flanders)	147
Belgian Albums (Ultratop Wallonia)	160
Dutch Albums (MegaCharts)	88
Mexican Albums (AMPROFON)	29
Spanish Albums (PROMUSICAE)	72
UK Albums (OCC)	92
US Billboard 200	122
US Top Rock Albums (Billboard)	17

Chart (2019)	Position
Belgian Albums (Ultratop Flanders)	146
Belgian Albums (Ultratop Wallonia)	186
Dutch Albums (Album Top 100)	86
Mexican Albums (AMPROFON)	16
US Billboard 200	73
US Top Rock Albums (Billboard)	9

Chart (2020)	Position
US Top Rock Albums (Billboard)	63

== Certifications ==
Certifications for Trench
Region	Certification	Certified units/sales
Australia (ARIA)	Gold	35,000^{‡}
Austria (IFPI Austria)	Platinum	15,000^{‡}
Brazil (Pro-Música Brasil)	Platinum	40,000^{‡}
Canada (Music Canada)	Platinum	80,000^{‡}
Denmark (IFPI Danmark)	Gold	10,000^{‡}
France (SNEP)	Platinum	100,000^{‡}
Italy (FIMI)	Gold	25,000^{‡}
Mexico (AMPROFON)	Gold	30,000^{‡}
Netherlands (NVPI)	Gold	18,600^{‡}
New Zealand (RMNZ)	Platinum	15,000^{‡}
Poland (ZPAV)	Platinum	20,000^{‡}
United Kingdom (BPI)	Gold	100,000^{‡}
United States (RIAA)	Platinum	1,000,000^{‡}
^{‡} Sales+streaming figures based on certification alone.

== Release history ==
Release history and formats for Trench
Region	Date	Format	Label	Ref.
Various	October 5, 2018	Digital download; streaming	Fueled by Ramen; Elektra Music Group	
Various	October 5, 2018	CD	Fueled by Ramen; Elektra Music Group	
Various	October 5, 2018	Vinyl LP	Fueled by Ramen; Elektra Music Group	
Various	October 5, 2018	Cassette	Fueled by Ramen; Elektra Music Group	

== See also ==
- List of number-one albums from the 2010s (New Zealand)
- List of number-one albums of 2018 (Australia)
- List of number-one albums of 2018 (Mexico)
- List of number-one albums of 2018 (Spain)
- List of concept albums
