= Neon Gravestones =

Twenty One Pilots song

Song by Twenty One Pilots

from the album Trench
- Released: October 5, 2018
- Studio: Tyler Joseph's home studio (Columbus, Ohio)
- Genre: Hip hop; spoken word
- Length: 4:00
- Label: Fueled by Ramen
- Songwriter: Tyler Joseph
- Producers: Tyler Joseph; Paul Meany

Audio video
- "Neon Gravestones" on YouTube

"Neon Gravestones" is a song by American musical duo Twenty One Pilots. It is the seventh track from their fifth studio album, Trench (2018). Tyler Joseph, the frontman of the band, wrote the song and produced it with Paul Meany. It is a hip hop piano ballad which confronts the glorification of suicide by media.

Upon Trench's release, "Neon Gravestones" attracted some controversy in the media for its take on suicide. Nevertheless, the song received positive reviews from music critics. It was a part of the set list for the band's Bandito Tour (2018–2019), and Joseph also performed a piano version of the song for BBC Radio 1's Live Lounge on November 2, 2018.

== Background ==
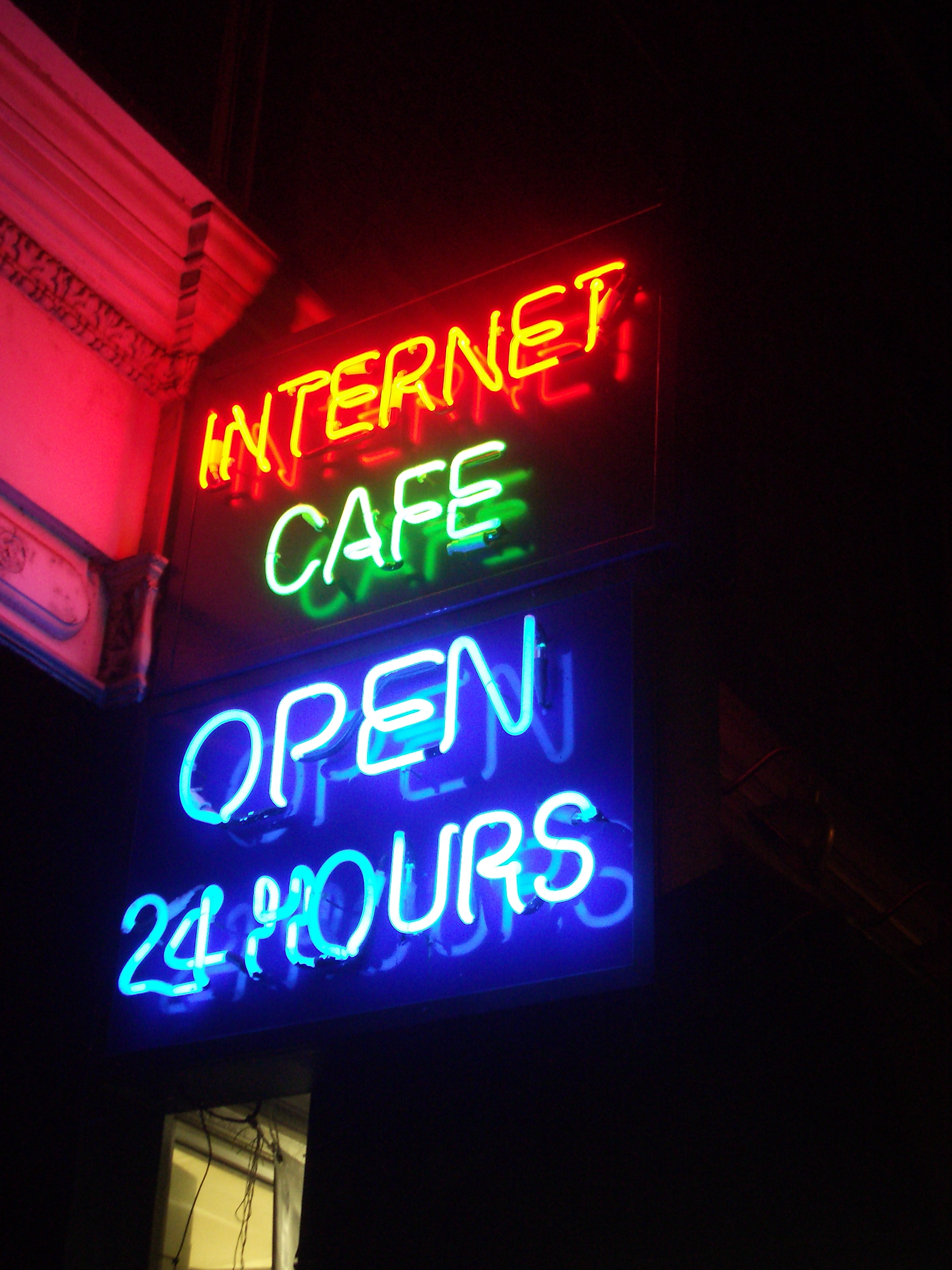
Neon advertising

The song was written and recorded by Tyler Joseph in his basement and produced alongside Paul Meany of alternative rock band Mutemath. Apart from the band's drummer Josh Dun, Joseph, and Meany, no other person, including friends and family members, was allowed to be present during the songwriting process; this was to not influence the song's direction. Some publications, including Billboard, have interpreted the "neon", which is often used for advertising, as a fake light, attracting someone towards death. Several music journalists have described the ending as directly linked to Trench's penultimate track, "Legend", which pays homage to Joseph's late grandfather, Robert, who appeared on the cover of the band's first major-label album, Vessel (2013).

I think at some point, "We hear you and we are here for you and we understand you" ...There's a point where that doesn't help. And what's the opposite of that? That's a challenge to step up and defeat something. To win.

— Tyler Joseph, speaking to Alternative Press

In an October 2018 interview with Kerrang!, Joseph revealed that he was uneasy about the placement of the song in the middle of the Trench, having heard concerns from outside opinions that it affected the flow of the album. He decided to keep the song in its place, believing it to be "the heart of Trench". Joseph was also worried about the sensitivity of the track, as was Dun, but both agreed to keep the song on the album. Executives at Atlantic Records were also "extremely concerned" by the song, with Joseph recalling in an interview that they described it as a "giant landmine in the middle of the record" and were concerned that if its message were misinterpreted it could potentially be career-ending for the band.

Some publications noted that the song could have been written in response to various celebrity suicides, such as those of Chester Bennington and Scott Hutchison, and the popularity of the Netflix series 13 Reasons Why. Joseph also explained that the song was "a reaction to what was happening in our culture", but added that he was still proud of "our culture," although his pride in it had been declining. He nonetheless "felt inclined to bring up a new perspective – a perspective that comes off a bit more aggressive and more of a challenge". In another interview, Joseph said he feared it would border on disrespect if he answered a fan's question on whether one particular death had caused him to write the song.

== Composition and lyrics ==
"Neon Gravestones"
A 29-second sample of the song "Neon Gravestone", a slow-burning hip hop piano ballad. Tyler Joseph raps lyrics which attack the glorification of suicide.

"Neon Gravestones" is a forlorn, slow-burning hip hop piano ballad that runs for a duration of four minutes. According to the sheet music published at Musicnotes.com by Alfred Publishing, it is written in the time signature of 3/4, with a fast tempo of 150 beats per minute. "Neon Gravestones" is composed in the key of B minor. The song has a basic sequence of Bm–F♯m_{7}–A_{6}–Esus2–G_{maj13}–G_{6}–G_{maj7} during the introduction, changes to Bm–F♯5–A_{sus2}–EG–G_{6}–G–G_{6} in the verses and chorus and follows A–Bm–Em_{6}/G–D at the bridge, interludes and coda as its chord progression. The musical composition is built on swirling piano and jittery calibrated drums. A somber 6/8 piano riff runs throughout atop electronic percussion, steadily picking up pace over time. Joseph alternates between singing and spoken word rapping, while pitching his voice to sound "especially fragile, hoarse, and tentative."

Lyrically, "Neon Gravestones" criticizes the media's glorification of suicide. Joseph challenges pop culture at large for not taking the mental health of troubled musicians more seriously while reckoning with the aftermath of numerous celebrity musicians who have taken their own lives. His balladic lyrics address the suicide crisis as well as other forms of untimely death. The song contains plainly introspective lyrics where Joseph discusses suicide, speaking with first-person singular pronouns rather than the collective "we". Joseph argues that there is a culture of romanticizing celebrity suicides, and grapples with the idea that some artists who choose to leave the world may have done so with their legacy in mind. These tendencies communicate a message that "an earlier grave is an optional way." Joseph closes the song by pleading for suicide not to be glorified, and advising the listener to instead pay respects to the elderly who have remained alive.

Joseph explained that the lyrics were "black and white" rather than metaphorical like most of the band's songs, as he didn't want "beautiful, pretty metaphors" distracting the listener from "the importance of the topic". He also described the track as "a view into the deeper reasons for what's going on in Dema that feels like I have to leave". Joseph later told Alternative Press that the song was one that "you have to live with for a while", one "you have to give oxygen and let it breathe". Dun added that the two of them generally agree with regards to spiritual or political subjects, which was one of the reasons why they made the track.

== Critical reception ==
The song was met with positive reviews from music critics, though most noted that it may attract some controversy for its unconventional take on suicide. Billboard journalist Paige Williams wrote that the song may redeem the band from those who saw them as glamorizing depression in the past. Christopher R. Weingarten of Rolling Stone said the song "is the most intense look at fame... moody and reflective". NME's Gary Ryan called the song a highlight of the album, an "elegiac, touching broadside against the fetishization of the 27 Club". Stereogum's Chris DeVille called the song "an unusual message in modern pop music, but unsurprising for a group that put their grandfathers on the cover of their major-label debut." Joshua Copperman, writing for PopMatters, deemed the song "the most compelling track" off Trench, but called its ending "too pat" compared to the rest of the song. Jason Pettigrew of Alternative Press placed it at number 29 on his ranking of all of the band's songs as of September 2019, hailing the song as "a brave statement in a troubling time".

Spencer Kornhaber of The Atlantic was more critical of "Neon Gravestones" regarding its message, arguing that to "deny" fans the right to pay homage to any deceased artist upon their death may be too cruel considering the impact of and affection attached to the artist's work. He continued, writing that "the song is less a coherent argument than a series of questions—tough ones about the departed, and tougher ones for those left behind". Pettigrew noted in an interview with the band that the song was one of the most controversial of their career. Calling it an "anti-suicide-glorifying anthem," Chris Willman of Variety said the song may be debated "not just by fans but some of the mental health specialists who track pop culture's statements on this stuff in the months to come". Martin Williams of The Herald predicted that the song would "undoubtedly receive a kneejerk response of insensitivity to victims with lines like: 'I'm not disrespecting what was left behind / just pleading that it does not get glorified'".

== Credits and personnel ==
Credits adapted from the liner notes of Trench and Twenty One Pilots' official YouTube channel.

Recording and management

- Published by Warner-Tamerlane publishing Corp. (BMI) and Stryker Joseph Music (BMI)
- Recorded in Tyler Joseph's home studio, Columbus, Ohio
- Mastered at Sterling Sound, New York City

Twenty One Pilots

- Tyler Joseph – vocals, piano, bass guitar, synthesizers, programming, songwriting, production
- Josh Dun – drums, percussion

Additional personnel

- Paul Meany – synthesizers, programming, production
- Adam Hawkins – mixing
- Chris Gehringer – mastering

== Charts ==
| Chart (2018) | Peak position |
|---|---|
| New Zealand Hot Singles (RMNZ) | 14 |
| US Hot Rock & Alternative Songs (Billboard) | 13 |
