= The Hype (Twenty One Pilots song) =

2019 single by Twenty One Pilots

Single by Twenty One Pilots

from the album Trench
- Released: July 16, 2019
- Recorded: 2017–2018
- Studio: Tyler Joseph's home studio (Columbus, OH); United Recording Studios (Hollywood, CA)
- Genre: Rock; alternative rock; indie rock
- Length: 4:25
- Label: Fueled by Ramen
- Songwriter: Tyler Joseph
- Producers: Tyler Joseph; Paul Meany (co.)

Twenty One Pilots singles chronology
"Chlorine" (2019)	"The Hype" (2019)	"Level of Concern" (2020)

Music video
- "The Hype" on YouTube

"The Hype" is a song recorded by American musical duo Twenty One Pilots. It was released through Fueled by Ramen and Elektra Music Group on July 16, 2019, as the sixth and final single from their fifth studio album, Trench (2018). The track was written by lead singer Tyler Joseph, with production being handled by himself and Paul Meany. The song's lyrics discuss perseverance and loyalty. "The Hype" reached a peak of number 3 on the US Billboard Hot Rock Songs chart.

== Composition ==
As with most of its parent album Trench, "The Hype" was written by Tyler Joseph, the lead singer of Twenty One Pilots, and produced by him alongside Paul Meany of the alternative rock band Mutemath. The songwriting process and recording took place in secret in Joseph's basement studio in Columbus, Ohio, while the track was mixed by Adam Hawkins and mastered by Chris Gehringer at Sterling Sound, New York City. In an interview with Coup de Main Magazine, Joseph revealed that while writing the track, he intended for its production to sound like that of which he found in his childhood. In an AMA on Reddit, he disclosed that the track was among the hardest to write on Trench.

"The Hype" has been described as a 90s-style rock, indie rock and alternative rock "chant-along" featuring a ukulele bridge. Lyrically, it explores themes of perseverance, loyalty and the weight of fame. Joseph explained that its lyrics address his younger self, discussing "the difference between internal pressure and external pressure," and described the track as "just an encouragement to keep going, to let things roll off your back that deserve to be put aside." He further added in an interview with Kerrang! that it reflects on the fragility of a song and how "a single comment can completely change it." A clip from the first episode of their web series documenting their tour in support of their second album Regional at Best is sampled during the bridge, with the audio snippet relating to their reliance on technology during live shows, following the departure of the band's two original members, Chris Salih and Nick Thomas.

== Music video ==
On July 26, 2019, Twenty One Pilots published an official music video for "The Hype" on YouTube. The video has garnered over 84 million views on YouTube as of January 2026.

=== Synopsis ===
The video starts off with Tyler Joseph standing in the middle of a road. He opens a flap on his shirt and reveals a house behind it; the video then zooms in on the window of the house, and the duo is shown performing the song inside its living room, with a few people watching and listen. In the middle of the second verse, the duo move to the house's garage. After singing the chorus for the second time, Joseph climbs a ladder, opens a door in the ceiling, and the duo performs on the house's roof. The video zooms out, showing that there is a much larger audience outside; one of them is holding Ned, a character from the duo's video for "Chlorine". Parts of the roof start exploding, creating holes, and Joseph falls through the roof. He then sings the final lyrics to the song inside the house. While Josh is playing the final instrumental part, the pieces of all the broken objects in the room start flying around and merging with the other pieces, which repairs all of the broken objects. Joseph walks over to a painting and uses yellow tape to secure it to the wall. The video ends with Joseph on the street closing the flap on his shirt and Dun giving him a cup filled with a strawberry drink.

== Critical reception ==
"The Hype" was critically acclaimed by music critics. Gary Ryan of NME opined that "The Hype" was one of the songs off Trench "strong enough to exist outside of any story," referring to the narrative found on the record. Billboard writer Chris Payne described the song as a "jubilant, crowd-ready panorama." In his review of Trench for AllMusic, Neil Z. Yeung lauded it as one of the record's "second-half highlights." Stephen Keegan, writing for Hot Press, considered that the track displayed "the pop sensibilities that have earned the band their audience," additionally predicting that the track "is sure to become an alternative anthem."

== Berlin version ==
"The Hype (Berlin)"

Song by Twenty One Pilots

from the EP Location Sessions
- Released: October 16, 2019
- Recorded: 2019
- Length: 4:10
- Label: Fueled by Ramen
- Songwriter: Tyler Joseph
- Producer: Tyler Joseph

Music video
- "The Hype (Berlin)" on YouTube

"The Hype (Berlin)" is a reimagined version of the song, released to streaming services on October 16, 2019. It is the third track of the EP Location Sessions, and was recorded in Berlin during the Lollapalooza Berlin concert session as part of the Bandito Tour. As with the reimagined version of "Chlorine", the track has piano and sparse beats, in addition to drums and synthesizers.

== Track listing ==
Digital download / CD
No.	Title	Length
1.	"The Hype"	4:25

== Credits and personnel ==
Credits adapted from the liner notes of Trench and Tidal.

Recording and management

- Published by Warner-Tamerlane publishing Corp. (BMI) and Stryker Joseph Music (BMI)
- Recorded at Tyler Joseph's home studio (Columbus, Ohio) and United Recording Studios (Hollywood, California)
- Mastered at Sterling Sound (New York, New York)

Twenty One Pilots

- Tyler Joseph – vocals, bass, synthesizers, ukulele, organs, piano, guitar, programming, songwriting, production
- Josh Dun – drums, percussion, backing vocals

Additional personnel

- Paul Meany – synthesizers, programming, production
- Adam Hawkins – mixing
- Chris Gehringer – mastering

== Charts ==
=== Weekly charts ===
Chart (2018–19)	Peak position
Belgium (Ultratip Bubbling Under Wallonia)	34
Canada Rock (Billboard)	8
Czech Republic Airplay (ČNS IFPI)	18
US Adult Pop Airplay (Billboard)	27
US Hot Rock & Alternative Songs (Billboard)	3
US Pop Airplay (Billboard)	39
US Rock & Alternative Airplay (Billboard)	1

=== Year-end charts ===
Chart (2019)	Position
US Rock Airplay (Billboard)	22
US Hot Rock & Alternative Songs (Billboard)	33
Chart (2020)	Position
US Rock Airplay (Billboard)	2
US Hot Rock & Alternative Songs (Billboard)	31

== Certifications ==
Region	Certification	Certified units/sales
Canada (Music Canada)	Gold	40,000^{‡}
United States (RIAA)	Gold	500,000^{‡}
^{‡} Sales+streaming figures based on certification alone.

== Release history ==
Region	Date	Format	Label(s)	Ref.
United States	July 16, 2019	Alternative	Fueled by Ramen; Elektra Music Group	
United States	August 13, 2019	Top 40 radio	Fueled by Ramen; Elektra Music Group	
