= Levitate (Twenty One Pilots song) =

Twenty One Pilots song

Single by Twenty One Pilots

from the album Trench
- B-side: "Nico and the Niners"
- Released: August 8, 2018
- Genre: Rap rock; hip hop
- Length: 2:25
- Label: Fueled by Ramen
- Songwriter: Tyler Joseph
- Producers: Tyler Joseph; Paul Meany

Twenty One Pilots singles chronology
"Jumpsuit" / "Nico and the Niners" (2018)	"Levitate" (2018)	"My Blood" (2018)

Music video
- "Levitate" on YouTube

"Levitate" is a song written and recorded by the American musical duo Twenty One Pilots. The song was released as the third single from their fifth studio album Trench on August 8, 2018.

== Composition ==
"Levitate" is a rap rock song which contains elements of hip hop and trap with psychedelic synths, electronic beats and fast-paced lyrics. It opens with the outro of the previous track on the album, "Jumpsuit". The song contains a reference to the lyrics of their song "Car Radio", where Tyler Joseph raps "I got back what I once bought, back in that slot I won't need to replace" in response to the chorus lyric from the 2013 song, "I ought to replace that slot with what I once bought, 'cause somebody stole my car radio and now I just sit in silence." The song was described by Rolling Stone as a "minimalist" track where "Joseph raps over warbled synths and Dun's primal pummel". He delivers a complex sequence of cascading rhyme schemes in quick succession metered to the up-tempo cadence of the track's beat in an insistent yet effortless manner that matches the propulsion of the pummeling rhythm. It has a tempo of 93 beats per minute and a duration of two minutes and twenty-five seconds.

== Release ==
The song was first leaked onto the music platform Tidal on August 7, 2018, only to be quickly removed. This was accompanied by a leaked track listing for the album. The song was subsequently released via Zane Lowe's Beats 1 show as the day's "World Record".

== Music video ==
The song's music video was released on August 8, 2018. The clip concludes the storyline from the two previous singles to start a new one and was directed by Andrew Donoho, who directed videos for the previous Trench singles. The video shows Tyler Joseph having his head shaved and rapping the song in a torch-lit mountain retreat filled with the rebel "Banditos" before being grabbed by one of the bishops, the leaders of Dema.

== Personnel ==
Credits adapted from the liner notes of Trench and Twenty One Pilots' official YouTube channel.

Twenty One Pilots

- Tyler Joseph – lead vocals, bass, keyboards, synthesizers, sampling, programming, songwriting, production
- Josh Dun – drums, drum engineering, percussion

Additional personnel

- Paul Meany – synthesizers, programming, production, backing vocals
- Adam Hawkins – mixing
- Chris Gehringer – mastering

== Charts ==
=== Weekly charts ===
Chart (2018)	Peak position
Czech Republic Singles Digital (ČNS IFPI)	90
New Zealand Hot Singles (RMNZ)	15
US Hot Rock & Alternative Songs (Billboard)	11

=== Year-end charts ===
Chart (2018)	Position
US Hot Rock Songs (Billboard)	67

== Certifications ==
Region	Certification	Certified units/sales
United States (RIAA)	Gold	500,000^{‡}
^{‡} Sales+streaming figures based on certification alone.
