= Jumpsuit (song) =

Twenty One Pilots song

Single by Twenty One Pilots

from the album Trench
- B-side: "Nico and the Niners"
- Released: July 11, 2018
- Genre: Hard rock; alternative rock; progressive rock; electronic rock
- Length: 3:58
- Label: Fueled by Ramen
- Songwriter: Tyler Joseph
- Producer: Tyler Joseph

Twenty One Pilots singles chronology
"Heavydirtysoul" (2016)	"Jumpsuit" / "Nico and the Niners" (2018)	"Levitate" (2018)

Music video
- "Jumpsuit" on YouTube

"Jumpsuit" is a song written and recorded by the American musical duo Twenty One Pilots. It was released on July 11, 2018, as the first of the lead singles from their fifth studio album Trench (2018), alongside "Nico and the Niners". The track was nominated for Best Rock Song at the 61st Annual Grammy Awards. Peaking at number 50 on the Billboard Hot 100, it is their fifth-highest-charting song, behind "Stressed Out", "Heathens", "Ride", and "Level of Concern".

== Background and release ==
The band started working on the song during the Emotional Roadshow World Tour (2016–2017). Tyler Joseph, the band's frontman, created the bass riff during that time and would play it during sound checks before shows. Following the tour, the band withdrew from public life in order to record the album Trench. Joseph revealed in an interview with NME that the album was originally supposed to be a "lighter sounding and softer record," but "then he wrote 'Jumpsuit' which ruined that." On July 6, 2018, the band broke their year-long public silence by an email of a closing eye with the words "ARE YOU STILL SLEEPING?" Three days later, they returned to social media for the first time since the hiatus, posting a clip from the official video for the song inside of an opening eye. On July 11, "Jumpsuit" was released along with its music video.

== Composition ==
"Jumpsuit" is a hard rock, alternative rock, progressive rock and electronic rock song, containing nu metal-styled hooks. It lasts for a duration of three minutes and fifty-eight seconds. According to the sheet music published at Musicnotes.com by Alfred Music, it is written in the time signature of common time, with a moderately fast tempo of 127 beats per minute. The song is composed in the key of B minor while Tyler Joseph's vocal range spans one octave and four notes, from a low of D_{3} to a high of G_{4}. Lyrically, the song features Clancy, the main character from the conceptual world of "Trench", calling for protection from the bishops, the leaders of the city Dema. The song was described by Rolling Stone as having "distorted bass guitar, crisp drumming and dark washes of synth" with frontman Tyler Joseph's vocals building from "a near-whisper to a full-throated scream, to an atmospheric falsetto." Idolator described its sound as alternating between "semi-acoustic and hard rock".

== Music video ==
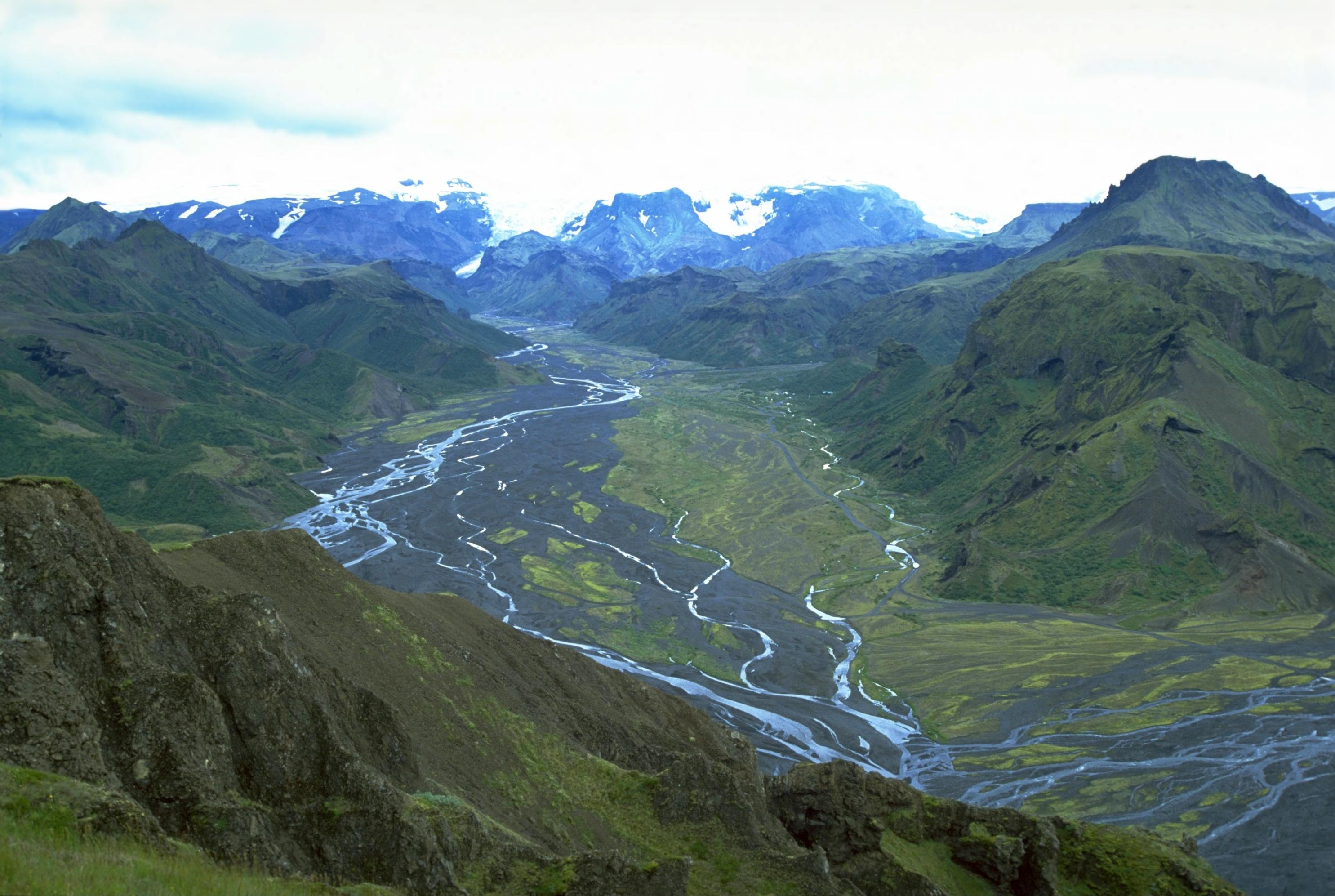
The music video for the song was filmed in Thórsmörk, Iceland (pictured).

A music video for "Jumpsuit" was released on July 11, 2018. It was directed by Andrew Donoho, who had previously directed the music videos for the duo's songs "Heathens" and "Heavydirtysoul". The video was filmed in Thórsmörk, Iceland. On July 12, 2018, the music video for "Jumpsuit" surpassed "Heathens" for the most YouTube views in one day for the band (5.2 million), and as of January 2026, has over 136 million views.

The video begins with the car from the "Heavydirtysoul" music video still smoldering, then catching on fire. Lead singer Tyler Joseph climbs onto the car and states to the viewers: "We've been here the whole time, you were asleep, it's time to wake up." The scene then cuts to a valley where Joseph is seen laying unconscious in a stream of water, he wakes up and observes his surroundings when mysterious people in yellow duct tape outfits appear upon the clifftops of the valley, watching him. As he makes his way through the valley, he is pursued by a red-hooded figure on a white stallion who coats his neck in black paint. He follows the red-hooded figure in a trance. The people in yellow toss petals at them, allowing him to attempt an escape. However, Joseph trips while running and is captured by the red-hooded figure. Joseph is seen opening the trunk of the flaming car and donning a yellow jumpsuit.

The clip was named one of the twelve best music videos of 2018 by the British rock music magazine Kerrang!.

== Reception ==
Chris Willman, writing for Variety, was positive of the song, saying "The color-coded storytelling of 'Jumpsuit' doesn't get in the way of its thunderous pleasures". PopMatters' Joshua Copperman called the song the band's "heaviest, even best song to date". Spin was critical of the song, finding the lyrics and backstory confusing, and feeling that its progressive rock-inspired song structure would not catch on at contemporary pop music.

The song was named the Hottest Record of the Year in 2018 by BBC Radio 1 during DJ Annie Mac's radio show. Billboard also deemed the song the best rock song of 2018. Loudwire featured it on their "40 best hard rock songs of 2018" list, placing it at No. 28. The track was nominated for Best Rock Song at the 61st Annual Grammy Awards.

== Commercial performance ==
"Jumpsuit" debuted at number 60 on the Billboard Hot 100 the week of July 21, 2018, with 11.4 million airplay audience impressions, 5.2 million U.S. streams and 22,000 downloads sold according to Nielsen Music, and peaked at number 50 the following week. The same month, "Jumpsuit" peaked at number one on the Billboard Alternative Songs chart, the band's fourth on the list. By taking two weeks to peak at number one, "Jumpsuit" became the fastest song to reach number one on the Alternative Songs chart in the 2010s. The song also peaked at number 6 on the Hot Rock Songs chart. Later, the song peaked at number one on the Rock Airplay chart, marking the band's third on the list.

== Live performances ==
Twenty One Pilots first played the song live at the Brixton Academy for their concert "A Complete Diversion", on stage with a flaming car and yellow petals from the original music video. They also performed the song at the 2018 American Music Awards with the same type of setting. It is the opener of the set list for The Bandito Tour, which took place from October 2018 to June 2019. Joseph revealed that the track was his favorite song to play live, calling it a "very useful song" due to the fact that "the song gives off the energy that is required to be injected into a room that can sustain for the course of an entire set."

== Track listing ==
Digital download / stream
No.	Title	Length
1.	"Jumpsuit"	3:58
2.	"Nico and the Niners"	3:47

== Credits and personnel ==
Credits adapted from the liner notes of Trench and Tidal.

Recording and management

- Published by Warner-Tamerlane Publishing Corp. (BMI) and Stryker Joseph Music (BMI)
- Recorded at Tyler Joseph's home studio (Columbus, Ohio) and United Recording Studios (Hollywood, California)
- Mastered at Sterling Sound (New York, New York)

Twenty One Pilots

- Tyler Joseph – vocals, bass, synthesizers, guitar, piano, programming, songwriting, production
- Josh Dun – drums, percussion

Additional personnel

- Paul Meany – synthesizers, programming, co-production
- Adam Hawkins – mixing
- Chris Gehringer – mastering

== Usage in media ==
The song appears on the soundtrack for the video game NHL 19, in addition to an episode of Riverdale.

== Charts ==
=== Weekly charts ===
Chart (2018)	Peak position
Australia (ARIA)	76
Austria (Ö3 Austria Top 40)	66
Belgium (Ultratip Bubbling Under Flanders)	22
Belgium (Ultratip Bubbling Under Wallonia)	12
Canada Hot 100 (Billboard)	61
Canada Rock (Billboard)	5
Czech Republic Singles Digital (ČNS IFPI)	2
France (SNEP)	125
Greece International Digital Singles (IFPI)	36
Hungary (Single Top 40)	6
Hungary (Stream Top 40)	27
Ireland (IRMA)	41
Mexico Ingles Airplay (Billboard)	29
New Zealand Hot Singles (RMNZ)	5
Portugal (AFP)	69
Scottish Singles Sales (Official Charts)	29
Slovakia Singles Digital (ČNS IFPI)	8
Sweden Heatseeker (Sverigetopplistan)	10
UK Singles (Official Charts)	50
US Billboard Hot 100	50
US Hot Rock & Alternative Songs (Billboard)	6
US Rock & Alternative Airplay (Billboard)	1

=== Year-end charts ===
Chart (2018)	Position
US Hot Rock Songs (Billboard)	15
US Rock Airplay (Billboard)	26

== Certifications ==
Region	Certification	Certified units/sales
Australia (ARIA)	Gold	35,000^{‡}
Canada (Music Canada)	Platinum	80,000^{‡}
New Zealand (RMNZ)	Gold	15,000^{‡}
Poland (ZPAV)	Gold	10,000^{‡}
United Kingdom (BPI)	Silver	200,000^{‡}
United States (RIAA)	Platinum	1,000,000^{‡}
^{‡} Sales+streaming figures based on certification alone.
