= Chlorine (song) =

Twenty One Pilots song

Single by Twenty One Pilots

from the album Trench
- Released: January 22, 2019
- Studio: Tyler Joseph's home studio, Columbus, Ohio; United Recording Studios, Hollywood, California
- Genre: Trip hop; rap rock; electropop
- Length: 5:24 (album version); 3:11 (single version)
- Label: Fueled by Ramen
- Songwriters: Tyler Joseph; Paul Meany
- Producers: Tyler Joseph; Paul Meany (co.)

Twenty One Pilots singles chronology
"My Blood" (2018)	"Chlorine" (2019)	"The Hype" (2019)

Music video
- "Chlorine" on YouTube

"Chlorine" is a song by American musical duo Twenty One Pilots. It was released through Fueled by Ramen on January 22, 2019, as the fifth single from their fifth studio album, Trench (2018). The track was written and produced by lead singer Tyler Joseph and Paul Meany of rock band Mutemath. It is a trip hop, rap rock and electropop song which discusses "how creativity can cleanse dark impulses but cause its own pain".

"Chlorine" was well received by music critics, who highlighted its catchiness and musical restraint compared to the band's previous work. Despite becoming the band's fifth number one single on the Billboard Alternative Songs chart and the first track from Trench to be certified platinum, "Chlorine" did not enter the Billboard Hot 100. However, it achieved a peak position of number five on the Bubbling Under Hot 100 chart. The song was sent to alternative radio on January 29, 2019, and to top 40 radio on March 19, 2019.

== Composition ==
As with much of Trench, "Chlorine" was written and produced by Tyler Joseph, the lead singer of Twenty One Pilots, and Paul Meany of Mutemath, who also provided part of the voice for the track's opening lines. The songwriting process and recording took place in secret in Joseph's basement studio in Columbus, Ohio, while the track was mixed by Adam Hawkins and mastered by Chris Gehringer at Sterling Sound, New York City. In an "Ask Me Anything" session on Reddit, Joseph wrote that "wrestling on trying to tackle what he was feeling in 'Chlorine' was exhausting."

According to sheet music published at Musicnotes.com by Sony/ATV Music Publishing, "Chlorine" is set in common time with a "melancholy" tempo of 90 beats per minute. The song is composed in the key of B♭ minor, with Joseph's vocals ranging between the notes of F_{3} and D♭_{5}. It is an electropop, trip hop and rap rock song featuring a lowered voice found on the band's previous album Blurryface and a "menacing, Zaytoven-esque piano twinkle". It has been described as a "menacing slow-burner" with an "annoyingly infectious" chorus comparable to the work of Bastille, Thom Yorke, DJ Shadow and Gym Class Heroes. Paige Williams of Billboard suggested that the track was about cleansing your mind from dark thoughts, while Caryn Ganz of The New York Times stated that it "describes how creativity can cleanse dark impulses but cause its own pain."

== Release ==
Trench was released on October 5, 2018. Chlorine was released as the fifth track of the album. On January 22, 2019, fans of Twenty One Pilots began speculating that a music video for the song "Chlorine" would be released the following day due to a series of teasers that the band posted on social media, including a short clip of a dirty swimming pool soundtracked by a drum beat similar to the one found on the track. Tyler Joseph, the band's lead singer, also posted a message on Twitter which reads "there's someone i'd like you guys to meet. i'll introduce you to him tomorrow. his name is Ned. <{•.•}>". However, the band later announced that they could not wait to share the video any longer and subsequently released the music video that same day. Just prior to this release, an image of a letter written by Clancy, the protagonist of the storyline of Trench, was uploaded to the website dmaorg.info, which prompts the file name 17–35.4527, 17 and 35.4527 being the atomic number and atomic mass of the chemical element chlorine respectively. Additionally, on January 23, the letter was updated with the words "than" and "happened" being replaced by "that" and "happen" respectively. A Reddit user later discovered that the letter changes spelled out the name "Ned", the name of the creature featured in song's music video.

On January 29, 2019, "Chlorine" was serviced to alternative radio and then released to Top 40 radio on March 19, 2019. Finally on February 8, the "Alt Mix" version of the song, which cuts the song's intro and outro, was released on streaming services.

== Reception ==
"Chlorine" received critical acclaim, with positive sentiments being directed towards its catchiness and the band's increased songwriting maturity compared to their antecedent records. Joshua Copperman of PopMatters complimented "Chlorine"'s musical restraint in comparison to the band's previous work and opined that it featured the "catchiest chorus on the record." Gary Ryan of NME wrote that the track was one of the songs off Trench "strong enough to exist outside of any story," referring to the narrative found on the album. Billboard writer Chris Payne found that the evolution of the band's musical style on tracks off Trench including "Chlorine" as "jarring." GIG Soup's Jo Cosgrove expressed a similar sentiment, further adding that the song was "catchy" and "in-depth." David Hayter of 411 Mania hailed the track as "delightful," ultimately concluding that it "is something both murky and spritely, psychologically wrought, but charmingly euphoric." Anne Nickoloff and Troy Smith of Cleveland.com named the release the eighth best Twenty One Pilots song, deeming it the most accessible track off Trench.

== Music video ==
The music video for "Chlorine" was uploaded upon the song's release as a single on January 22, 2019, and was directed by Mark C. Eshleman of Reel Bear Media. It shows the duo filling up a dirty swimming pool and cleaning it while being watched by a small, white alien-like creature with small antlers, black eyes and hairy bat-like ears named Ned. When the duo finish cleaning and filling the pool, Ned dives into it and his antlers seem to grow in response. The video ends with Joseph sitting in an empty pool accompanied by the creature, whose antlers begin to shrink again, before offering it a cup containing an unknown substance, which Ned refuses to take. As of January 28, 2026, the video has surpassed 646 million views on YouTube.

The creation of the character Ned was undertaken from mid-December 2018 using 3D VFX and physical stand-in mold. In an interview in Kyiv during The Bandito Tour, the band explained that Ned represents "this idea of creativity and trying to take care of it and trying to please it... or appease it."

== 19.4326° N, 99.1332° W version ==
"Chlorine (19.4326° N, 99.1332° W)"

Song by Twenty One Pilots

from the EP Location Sessions
- Released: June 21, 2019
- Recorded: 2019
- Length: 3:58
- Label: Fueled by Ramen
- Songwriters: Tyler Joseph; Paul Meany

Music video
- "Chlorine (19.4326° N, 99.1332° W)" on YouTube

"Chlorine (19.4326° N, 99.1332° W)" is a re-imagined version of the track released to streaming services on June 21, 2019. It is the first unplugged performance of a track from Trench to be released from the band's Location Sessions series, and is presumed to have been recorded at a private concert in Mexico City, where the coordinates in the song's title points. Musically, it features Joseph singing "Chlorine" over a piano and a sparse beat.

== Track listing ==
US promotional CD
No.	Title	Length
1.	"Chlorine" (radio edit #1)	2:55
2.	"Chlorine" (radio edit #2)	2:02
3.	"Chlorine" (radio edit #3)	1:59
4.	"Chlorine" (album version)	5:24
5.	"Chlorine" (instrumental)	5:25

Spotify single
No.	Title	Length
1.	"Chlorine"	5:24
2.	"Chlorine" (Alt Mix)	3:11

Chlorine (19.4326° N, 99.1332° W)
No.	Title	Length
1.	"Chlorine (19.4326° N, 99.1332° W)"	3:58

== Credits and personnel ==
Credits adapted from the liner notes of Trench and Twenty One Pilots' official YouTube channel.

Recording and management

- Published by Warner-Tamerlane publishing Corp. (BMI) and Stryker Joseph Music (BMI)
- Recorded at Tyler Joseph's home studio (Columbus, Ohio) and United Recording Studios (Hollywood, California)
- Mastered at Sterling Sound (New York, New York)

Twenty One Pilots

- Tyler Joseph – lead vocals, bass, synthesizers, guitar, programming, keyboards, songwriting, production
- Josh Dun – drums, trumpet, percussion, backing vocals

Additional personnel

- Paul Meany – synthesizers, programming, songwriting, vocals, co-production
- Adam Hawkins – mixing
- Chris Gehringer – mastering

== Charts ==
=== Weekly charts ===
Chart (2018–2019)	Peak position
Austria (Ö3 Austria Top 40)	37
Belgium (Ultratip Bubbling Under Wallonia)	16
Canada Hot 100 (Billboard)	85
Canada Rock (Billboard)	10
Czech Republic Airplay (ČNS IFPI)	6
Czech Republic Singles Digital (ČNS IFPI)	14
Finland (Suomen virallinen lista)	65
Ireland (IRMA)	64
Lithuania (AGATA)	31
Mexico Airplay (Billboard)	1
Mexico Ingles Airplay (Billboard)	1
New Zealand Hot Singles (RMNZ)	12
Romania (Airplay 100)	66
Scotland Singles (Official Charts)	81
Slovakia Singles Digital (ČNS IFPI)	28
Slovakia Airplay (ČNS IFPI)	15
Switzerland (Schweizer Hitparade)	82
Ukraine Airplay (TopHit)	78
US Bubbling Under Hot 100 (Billboard)	5
US Hot Rock & Alternative Songs (Billboard)	3
US Pop Airplay (Billboard)	32
US Rock & Alternative Airplay (Billboard)	4

=== Year-end charts ===
Chart (2018)	Position
US Hot Rock Songs (Billboard)	97
Chart (2019)	Position
Latvia (LAIPA)	80
US Hot Rock Songs (Billboard)	6
US Rock Airplay (Billboard)	23

== Certifications ==
Region	Certification	Certified units/sales
Austria (IFPI Austria)	Platinum	30,000^{‡}
Canada (Music Canada)	3× Platinum	240,000^{‡}
France (SNEP)	Gold	100,000^{‡}
Italy (FIMI)	Gold	50,000^{‡}
New Zealand (RMNZ)	Platinum	30,000^{‡}
Poland (ZPAV)	2× Platinum	40,000^{‡}
Portugal (AFP)	Gold	5,000^{‡}
United Kingdom (BPI)	Gold	400,000^{‡}
United States (RIAA)	2× Platinum	2,000,000^{‡}
^{‡} Sales+streaming figures based on certification alone.

== Release history ==
Region	Date	Format	Label(s)	Ref.
United States	January 29, 2019	Alternative	Fueled by Ramen; Elektra Music Group	
United States	March 19, 2019	Top 40 radio	Fueled by Ramen; Elektra Music Group	
