= My Blood (Twenty One Pilots song) =

Twenty One Pilots song

Single by Twenty One Pilots

from the album Trench
- Released: August 27, 2018
- Genre: Indie rock; disco; funk; R&B
- Length: 3:49
- Label: Fueled by Ramen
- Songwriter: Tyler Joseph
- Producer: Tyler Joseph

Twenty One Pilots singles chronology
"Levitate" (2018)	"My Blood" (2018)	"Chlorine" (2019)

Music video
- "My Blood" on YouTube

"My Blood" is a song written and recorded by the American musical duo Twenty One Pilots. The song was released as the fourth single from their fifth studio album, Trench, on August 27, 2018. An accompanying music video for the song was released on October 5, 2018, hours after the release of its parent album. The song peaked at No. 81 on the US Billboard Hot 100.

== Background ==
"My Blood" was released as the fourth single from Trench on August 27, 2018. It was the latest glimpse into a dark rebel story supporting their fifth studio album Trench. The song's lyrics potentially continue the storyline that first emerged from the three album tracks that had been released, "Jumpsuit", "Nico and the Niners" and "Levitate". They had begun laying out the story of Nico and the Niners, a group appearing to be the new version to the tormented character of Blurryface and the rebel group the Banditos. However, it has not been confirmed if "My Blood" is a continuation of the story encompassing the trilogy of official music videos, but the lyrics do appear to have a maverick spirit in the third verse.

== Composition ==
"My Blood" is a disco-tipped indie rock song that lasts for a duration of three minutes and forty-nine seconds. The moody, groove-driven track contains R&B hooks and has a throbbing beat underpinned with robotic drums and thick funk generated by a rolling, distorted bass line. According to the sheet music published at Musicnotes.com by Alfred Music, it is written in the time signature of common time, with a moderately fast tempo of 109 beats per minute. "My Blood" is composed in the key of A♭ major while Tyler Joseph's vocal range spans two octaves, from the low-note of E♭_{3} to the high-note of E♭_{5}.

Lyrically, "My Blood" is an uplifting number that contains inspirational lines. The song feature lyrics that illustrate supporting someone who is being attacked after being abandoned by friends. They convey the idea not being alone, even when one feels desperately isolated. The song's lyrics retain a maverick spirit within its third verse, where Joseph cryptically raps, "If there comes a day/People posted up at the end of your driveway/They're callin' for your head and they're callin' for your name/I'll bomb down on 'em, I'm comin' through/Do they know I was grown with you?" The musical arrangement builds into an effervescent chorus where Joseph sings in a keening falsetto and repeatedly cries out, "Stay with me, my blood, you don't need to run."

== Release and promotion ==
"My Blood" is one of five singles Twenty One Pilots released from their fourth studio album, Trench. The duo also coupled the three songs with music videos that serve to form a visual trilogy. A ten-second snippet of the new song was released by Twenty One Pilots at the end of a commercial for their forthcoming album. It debuted on August 20, 2018, during the MTV Video Music Awards. Following short clips taken from their "Jumpsuit" and "Nico and the Niners" music videos, the commercial played a third song.

On August 27, 2018, an audio release of the track included one-shot video footage of frontman Tyler Joseph in a recording studio lined by guitars on the walls. He is seen from behind playing the song's grooving bassline and bobbing his head along to the track's beat and melodies. While covered in darkness, he is seen playing the hypnotic bass line for the song. It featured a disco-sounding groove as well as Joseph singing in falsetto the lines, "Stay with me, my blood." The lyrics caused fans to speculate that the unreleased track was likely "My Blood", a title from the track listing for Trench that the duo released earlier that month. Joseph had just updated his Instagram for the first time in over a year with a shot taken from the dark studio session scene.

The official audio video has since been made unlisted on YouTube.

== Critical reception ==
"My Blood" received positive reviews. Billboard contributor Shea Lenninger called "My Blood" a fresh take on the duo's style and described its chorus as catchy. Gil Kaufman, from the same publication, quipped that "Twenty One Pilots seemed determined to show us the full breadth of their musical playbook" with the release of the single, praising Tyler Joseph's "keening falsetto that would make the Bee Gees proud." Citing it among the "fresh tricks" found on Trench, AllMusic's Neil Z. Yeung also applauded Joseph's use of falsetto range on the track. Chris Willman for Variety called "My Blood" an "uplifting, disco-tipped track." Complimenting its "glowing '80s chorus", Chris DeVille for Stereogum cited the song as Trench's "closest thing to a pop crossover bid". He ranked "My Blood" at number thirty-one on their "40 Best Pop Songs of 2018" list and remarked, "Hooks on falsetto hooks over an impeccably funky rolling bassline, with inspirational lyrics and effervescent '80s fizz to boot. Imagine the pools of saliva that would be forming under critics' mouths if this song was by the 1975."

== Commercial performance ==
The song debuted at No. 13 on the US Hot Rock Songs the week of September 8, 2018, and peaked at No. 4 on January 8, 2019. It debuted at No. 81 on the Billboard Hot 100 the week of October 20, 2018, before falling out the following week. It also entered the UK Singles Charts at No. 88 on September 7, 2018, before leaving the chart. Upon the album's release, the song re-entered the chart at a new peak of 62.

== Music video ==
Twenty One Pilots commemorated the release day of their fifth album on October 5, 2018, by premiering the music video for "My Blood." The video was directed by Tim Mattia and stars actors Trent Culkin, Dashiell Connery, and James Bud. It follows after a story trilogy told in the first three videos from Trench, "Nico and the Niners", "Jumpsuit" and "Levitate". The video takes a different approach and temporarily departs from the thematic narrative of Trench in what appears to be an homage to the coming-of-age novel The Outsiders by S.E. Hinton, featuring two brothers, an older, loud, instigative troublemaker and a younger, quiet, shy and sensitive introvert whose bond is solidified by a childhood spent with an alcoholic father.

The music video begins with two brothers somberly watching their father soothing their mother who is laying in a hospital bed. The dramatic video unfolds a story where the duo honor an unwavering brotherly bond. The video focuses on the pair of siblings as children and teenagers, alternating back and forth between adolescent mischief and the childhood trauma of watching their mother in the hospital. They are frequently at odds with jocks at their high school whom they taunt and perpetually seem to be on the edge of fighting. The duo are an inseparable pair of high school outcasts, with the more rebellious brother taking the other under his wing. As he and his brother wander small-town streets, the edgier character shatters a mailbox, confronts the local group of jocks and chugs from a flask. The situation between them and the school jocks intensifies at a Halloween party, where the siblings arrive dressed in skeleton outfits and dance to a house-band, portrayed by Twenty One Pilots. When the football players realize who the masked pair are, they follow them home and beat up the older brother. This prompts the timid yet protective younger brother to charge forward and attack them with a baseball bat, chasing them off. However, in a twist, it is shown through flashbacks that the older brother is a coping mechanism, created by the younger brother, due to the childhood trauma he had experienced growing up.

=== Reception ===
Billboard's Gil Kaufman describe the music video as both "deep" and "affecting" while comparing it to the 1999 film Fight Club. The video for "My Blood" was named one of the top ten best alternative music videos of 2018 by iHeartRadio, with columnist Katrina Nattress claiming it "has one of the most jaw-dropping twists at the end."

== Live performance ==
Twenty One Pilots performed "My Blood" for a two-hour set at Xcel Energy Center in Minneapolis–St. Paul during the fifth venue stop of their Bandito Tour.

== Track listing ==
US promotional CD
No.	Title	Length
1.	"My Blood" (album version)	3:49
2.	"My Blood" (instrumental)	3:49

Spotify Single
No.	Title	Length
1.	"My Blood"	3:49
2.	"Jumpsuit"	3:58
3.	"Levitate"	2:25
4.	"Nico and the Niners"	3:45

== Personnel ==
- Tyler Joseph – vocals, keyboards, bass guitar, piano, synthesizers, programming, production, songwriting
- Josh Dun – drums, percussion

== Charts ==
=== Weekly charts ===
Chart (2018–2019)	Peak position
Belgium (Ultratip Bubbling Under Flanders)	22
Belgium (Ultratip Bubbling Under Wallonia)	18
Canada Hot 100 (Billboard)	76
Canada CHR/Top 40 (Billboard)	50
Canada Rock (Billboard)	7
Czech Republic Singles Digital (ČNS IFPI)	29
Greece International Digital Singles (IFPI)	91
Hungary (Stream Top 40)	40
Ireland (IRMA)	61
Lithuania (AGATA)	32
Mexico Ingles Airplay (Billboard)	12
New Zealand Hot Singles (RMNZ)	12
Portugal (AFP)	96
Slovakia Singles Digital (ČNS IFPI)	34
UK Singles (Official Charts)	62
US Billboard Hot 100	81
US Hot Rock & Alternative Songs (Billboard)	4
US Pop Airplay (Billboard)	34
US Rock & Alternative Airplay (Billboard)	10

=== Year-end charts ===
Chart (2018)	Position
US Hot Rock Songs (Billboard)	22
US Rock Airplay (Billboard)	50
Chart (2019)	Position
US Rock Airplay (Billboard)	24

== Certifications ==
Region	Certification	Certified units/sales
Canada (Music Canada)	Platinum	80,000^{‡}
New Zealand (RMNZ)	Gold	15,000^{‡}
Poland (ZPAV)	Gold	10,000^{‡}
United Kingdom (BPI)	Silver	200,000^{‡}
United States (RIAA)	Platinum	1,000,000^{‡}
^{‡} Sales+streaming figures based on certification alone.
