= List of number-one albums of 2018 (Spain) =

Top 100 España is a record chart published weekly by PROMUSICAE (Productores de Música de España), a non-profit organization composed by Spain and multinational record companies. This association tracks record sales (physical and digital) in Spain.

== Albums ==
Week	Chart date	Album	Artist(s)	Ref
1	January 4	Prometo	Pablo Alborán	
2	January 11	Prometo	Pablo Alborán	
3	January 18	Camila	Camila Cabello	
4	January 25	Operación Triunfo 2017: Lo Mejor 1ª Parte	Various artists	
5	February 1	Operación Triunfo 2017: Lo Mejor 1ª Parte	Various artists	
6	February 8	Operación Triunfo 2017: No puedo vivir sin ti	Various artists	
7	February 15	Operación Triunfo 2017: No puedo vivir sin ti	Various artists	
8	February 22	Operación Triunfo 2017: No puedo vivir sin ti	Various artists	
9	March 1	Operación Triunfo 2017: Lo Mejor 2ª Parte	Various artists	
10	March 8	Operación Triunfo 2017: Lo Mejor 2ª Parte	Various artists	
11	March 15	Ahora	Melendi	
12	March 22	Geometría del rayo	Manolo García	
13	March 29	Geometría del rayo	Manolo García	
14	April 5	Geometría del rayo	Manolo García	
15	April 12	Geometría del rayo	Manolo García	
16	April 19	Geometría del rayo	Manolo García	
17	April 26	Rock and Roll Actitud (1978–2018)	Loquillo	
18	May 3	Bajo tus alas	Niña Pastori	
19	May 10	Bajo tus alas	Niña Pastori	
20	May 17	Tranquility Base Hotel & Casino	Arctic Monkeys	
21	May 24	El gran truco final	Love of Lesbian	
22	May 31	Shawn Mendes	Shawn Mendes	
23	June 7	Nacidos para creer	Amaia Montero	
24	June 14	Prometo	Pablo Alborán	
25	June 21	Liberation	Christina Aguilera	
26	June 28	Stereo	Gemeliers	
27	July 5	Principios	Cepeda	
28	July 12	Principios	Cepeda	
29	July 19	Principios	Cepeda	
30	July 26	Principios	Cepeda	
31	August 2	Principios	Cepeda	
32	August 9	Prometo	Pablo Alborán	
33	August 16	Prometo	Pablo Alborán	
34	August 23	Sweetener	Ariana Grande	
35	August 30	Sweetener	Ariana Grande	
36	September 6	Míranos	Marta Soto	
37	September 13	Guerra	Carlos Rivera	
38	September 20	Complicado	Blas Cantó	
39	September 27	Oxígeno	Malú	
40	October 4	Oxígeno	Malú	
41	October 11	Trench	Twenty One Pilots	
42	October 18	Oxígeno	Malú	
43	October 25	A un milímetro de ti	Antonio José	
44	November 1	Balas perdidas	Morat	
45	November 8	Operación Triunfo 2018: Lo Mejor 1ª Parte	Various artists	
46	November 15	El mal querer	Rosalía	
47	November 22	Todas las mujeres que habitan en mí	Vanesa Martín	
48	November 29	Cicatrices	Miriam Rodríguez	
49	December 6	Tráiler	Aitana	
50	December 13	La Cruz del Mapa	Manuel Carrasco	
51	December 20	La Cruz del Mapa	Manuel Carrasco	
52	December 27	La Cruz del Mapa	Manuel Carrasco	
