= Marta Soto =

Spanish singer and songwriter (born 1996)

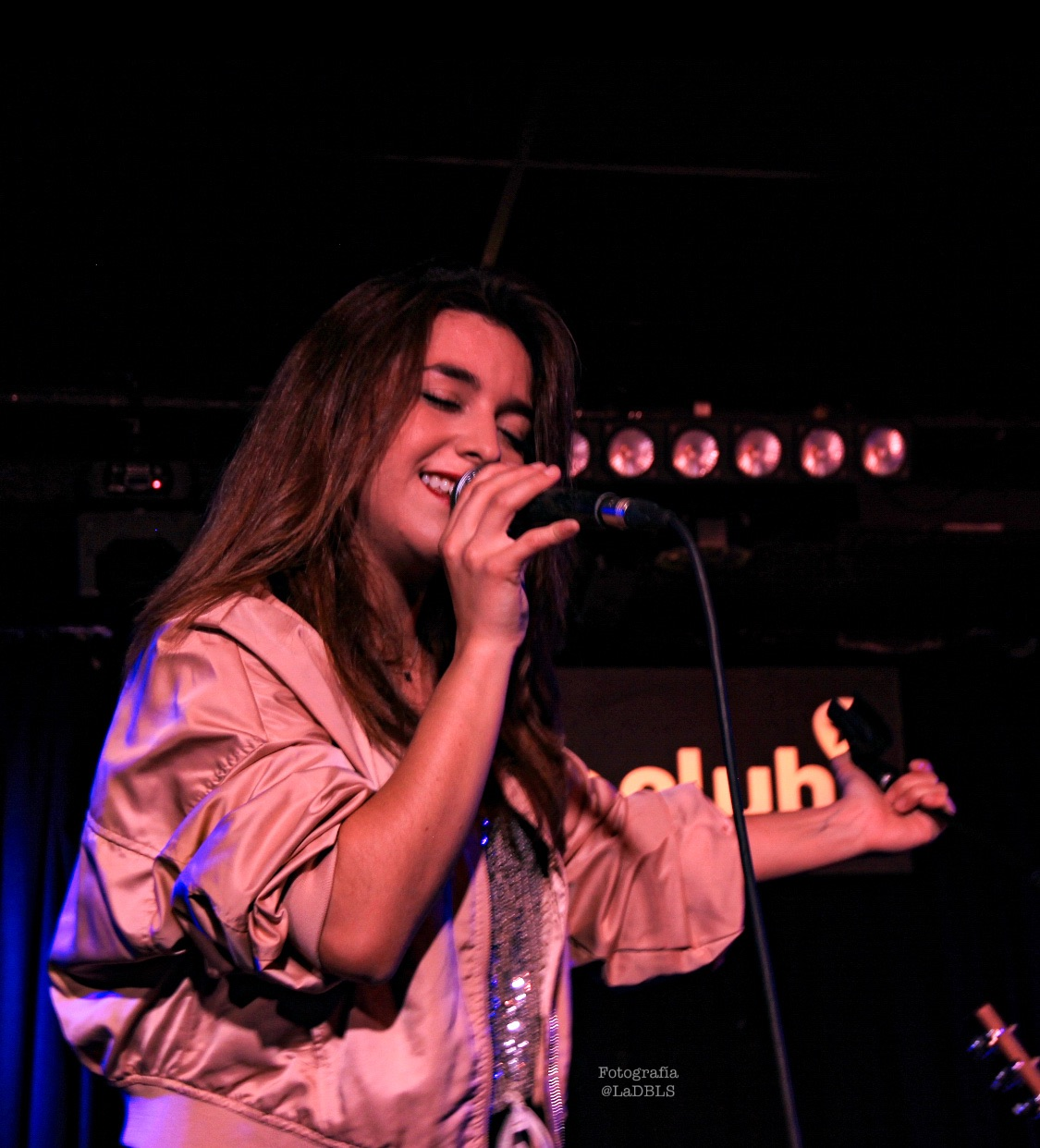

Background information
- Born: Marta Soto; 15 November 1996 (age 29); Punta Umbría, Huelva, Andalusia, Spain
- Origin: Spanish
- Genres: Flamenco; Pop; Acoustic
- Occupations: Singer; Musician
- Instrument: Guitar
- Years active: 2013–present
- Label: Warner Music Spain
- Website: martasotooficial.com

Marta Soto (born 15 November 1996) is a Spanish singer and songwriter. She is mostly known for her song "Quiero Verte", which made an appearance on the Spanish television program Survivor, and for her debut album Míranos, which reached Number 1 on the Spanish sales charts in the first week after its release.

== Early life ==
Soto was born and grew up in Punta Umbría, located in Huelva. Through the influence of his relatives, she began to take singing lessons and dedicated herself to learning to play the guitar through the Internet.

== Career ==
=== 2013–2015: First releases ===
In August 2014, Marta begins to upload her covers of songs to YouTube. The first cover she published was "Saltan Chispas", by Rozalén. On 22 October of that year, Soto publishes his version of Antonio Orozco's song, "Pedacitos De Ti".

In the last months of 2014, Soto was discovered by Daniel Ruiz, a music producer from the city of Cádiz. This encourages her to start composing her own songs, while Ruiz begins to produce his songs.

On 19 February 2015, Marta Soto released "Te Encuentro", this being her first own release.

In April of that year, Soto gave her first live concert in Punta Umbría. This would take place in a city bar called Africa.

On 16 September, Marta Soto released her cover of Alejandro Sanz's song, "A Que No Me Dejas".

=== 2016–2017: El Hormiguero and national recognition ===
In 2016, El Hormiguero had invited the singer Alejandro Sanz, but was unable to attend because he was in Paraguay doing his Sirope Tour, so it was decided to call Marta Soto to be replaced, making a presentation in the program singing "A Que No Me Dejas".

On 26 May 2017, Marta Soto, in collaboration with Warner Music Group, published the extended play Ya Lo Sabes. This has the previously released song "Ya Lo Sabes" and a new song called "Tantos Bailes", in an acoustic version. That same day, the official video clip for the song "Ya Lo Sabes" was released.

On 13 October, the extended play Quiero Verte was released. The EP featured the songs "Quiero Verte", "Que Curiosidad", "Entre Otros Cien (acoustic version)" and "Bis De Ti (demo version)".

=== 2018–present: Míranos ===
On 6 July, Soto published the song "Un Sueño Compartido". The song was chosen as the official song of the Spain women's national basketball team for the World Cup.

On 31 August, Marta Soto releases her first studio album, "Míranos". The album has the collaborations of the artists Blas Cantó and Julia Medina. This has 12 songs, bringing with it some that had been released previously. The album entered directly to number 1 of the best-selling albums of the week in Spain.

On 13 February 2020, Soto published the single "Hoy en El Metro".

On 24 April 2020, Soto launched her third extended play, Como Nos Miraba El Mundo. The EP contains the songs "Como Nos Miraba El Mundo (Acústico)", "Vuela (Acústico)" and "Hoy en el metro".

== Discography ==
=== Studio albums ===
Title	Details
Míranos	Released: 31 Aug 2018; Label: Warner Music Spain; Format: CD, Digital download

=== EP's ===
Title	Details
Ya Lo Sabes	Released: 26 May 2017; Label: Warner Music Spain; Format: Digital download
Quiero Verte	Released: 13 October 2017; Label: Warner Music Spain; Format: Digital download
Como Nos Miraba El Mundo	Released: 24 April 2020; Label: Warner Music Spain; Format: Digital download
