= Nico and the Niners =

Twenty One Pilots song

Single by Twenty One Pilots

from the album Trench
- A-side: "Jumpsuit"
- Released: July 11, 2018
- Genre: Reggae; hip hop; rock; psychedelia; trip hop
- Length: 3:47
- Label: Fueled by Ramen
- Songwriter: Tyler Joseph
- Producer: Tyler Joseph

Twenty One Pilots singles chronology
"Heavydirtysoul" (2016)	"Jumpsuit" / "Nico and the Niners" (2018)	"Levitate" (2018)

Music video
- "Nico and the Niners" on YouTube

"Nico and the Niners" is a song written and recorded by the American musical duo Twenty One Pilots. It was released on July 11, 2018, as the second of the lead singles from their fifth studio album Trench (2018), alongside "Jumpsuit". The song peaked at number 79 on the US Billboard Hot 100 chart.

== Composition ==
"Nico and the Niners" is a reggae, rap, rock and psychedelia song with a length of three minutes and forty-seven seconds. It was the first song to be completed off Trench. The song is played in an A minor key, and at 140 beats per minute.

== Music video ==
A music video for "Nico and the Niners" was released on July 26, 2018. It was directed by Andrew Donoho, who had directed all the music videos from the Trench trilogy, and was filmed in Kharkiv and Kyiv, Ukraine.

The video shows Clancy (played by Tyler Joseph) packing a backpack and meeting the Torchbearer (played by Josh Dun) in Dema's faded city square, where they shake hands before joining a group of rebels laden with yellow (called the "Banditos") and perform the song. The video veers between that mysterious thread and the mystical activities of malevolent red-hooded robed figures (also known as the bishops). At the very end of the video, two children discover a Bandito's lost gear, but turn to see the nine bishops, the leaders of Dema, walking towards them.

== Commercial performance ==
"Nico and the Niners" made its debut on the Bubbling Under Hot 100 Singles chart at No. 6 and Hot Rock Songs at No. 9 with 19,000 sold. The song peaked at No. 79 on the Billboard Hot 100, and peaked at No. 7 on the Hot Rock Songs chart. The song also peaked at No. 88 on the UK Singles Chart.

== Track listing ==
Digital download / stream
No.	Title	Length
1.	"Jumpsuit"	3:58
2.	"Nico and the Niners"	3:47

== Personnel ==
- Tyler Joseph – lead vocals, keyboards, bass, synthesizers, guitar, programming, ukulele, production, songwriting
- Josh Dun – drums, percussion, backing vocals
- Adam Hawkins – mixing

== Charts ==
=== Weekly charts ===
Chart (2018)	Peak position
Czech Republic Singles Digital (ČNS IFPI)	45
France (SNEP)	158
Greece International Digital Singles (IFPI)	46
Hungary (Single Top 40)	24
Hungary (Stream Top 40)	36
New Zealand Hot Singles (RMNZ)	7
Slovakia Singles Digital (ČNS IFPI)	31
UK Singles (Official Charts)	88
US Billboard Hot 100	79
US Hot Rock & Alternative Songs (Billboard)	7

=== Year-end charts ===
Chart (2018)	Position
US Hot Rock Songs (Billboard)	21

== Certifications ==
Region	Certification	Certified units/sales
Canada (Music Canada)	Gold	40,000^{‡}
New Zealand (RMNZ)	Gold	15,000^{‡}
Poland (ZPAV)	Gold	10,000^{‡}
United States (RIAA)	Gold	500,000^{‡}
^{‡} Sales+streaming figures based on certification alone.
