= History of depression =

What was previously known as melancholia and is now known as clinical depression, major depression, or simply depression and commonly referred to as major depressive disorder by many health care professionals, has a long history, with similar conditions being described at least as far back as classical times.

== Ancient to medieval period ==
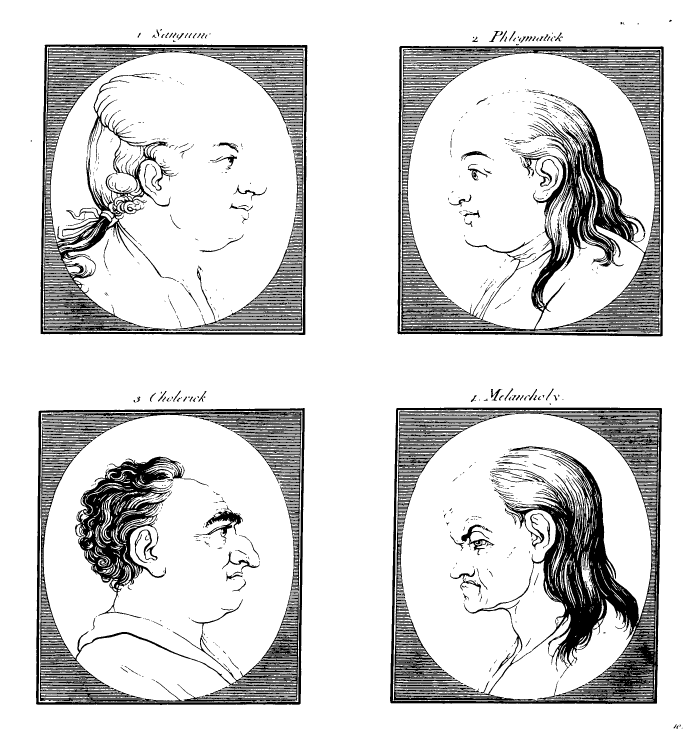
The four temperaments clockwise from top left (sanguine; phlegmatic; melancholic; choleric) according to an ancient theory of mental states

In ancient Greece, disease was thought due to an imbalance in the four basic bodily fluids, or humors. Personality types were similarly thought to be determined by the dominant humor in a particular person. Derived from the Ancient Greek melas, "black", and kholé, "bile", melancholia was described as a distinct disease with particular mental and physical symptoms by Hippocrates in his Aphorisms, where he characterized all "fears and despondencies, if they last a long time" as being symptomatic of the ailment.

Aretaeus of Cappadocia later noted that sufferers were "dull or stern; dejected or unreasonably torpid, without any manifest cause". The humoral theory fell out of favor but was revived in Rome by Galen. Melancholia was a far broader concept than today's depression; prominence was given to a clustering of the symptoms of sadness, dejection, and despondency, and often fear, anger, delusions and obsessions were included.

Physicians in the Persian and then the Muslim world developed ideas about melancholia during the Islamic Golden Age. Ishaq ibn Imran (d. 908) combined the concepts of melancholia and phrenitis. The 11th century Persian physician Avicenna described melancholia as a depressive type of mood disorder in which the person may become suspicious and develop certain types of phobias.

His work, The Canon of Medicine, became the standard of medical thinking in Europe alongside those of Hippocrates and Galen. Moral and spiritual observations also abounded, and in the Christian environment of medieval Europe, a malaise called acedia (sloth or absence of caring) was identified, involving a tendency of the will to low spirits and lethargy typically linked to isolation.

The seminal scholarly work of the 17th century was English scholar Robert Burton's book, The Anatomy of Melancholy, drawing on numerous theories and the author's own experiences. Burton suggested that melancholy could be combatted with a healthy diet, sufficient sleep, music, and "meaningful work", along with talking about the problem with a friend.

During the 18th century, the humoral theory of melancholia was increasingly being challenged by mechanical and electrical explanations; references to dark and gloomy states gave way to ideas of slowed circulation and depleted energy. German physician Johann Christian Heinroth, however, argued melancholia was a disturbance of the soul due to moral conflict within the patient.

Eventually, various authors proposed up to 30 different sub-types of melancholia, and alternative terms were suggested and discarded. Hypochondria came to be seen as a separate disorder. Melancholia and melancholy had been used interchangeably until the 19th century, but the former came to refer to a pathological condition and the latter to a temperament.

The term depression was derived from the Latin verb deprimere, "to press down". From the 14th century, "to depress" meant to subjugate or to bring down in spirits. It was used in 1665 in English author Richard Baker's Chronicle to refer to someone having "a great depression of spirit", and by English author Samuel Johnson in a similar sense in 1753. The term also came into use in physiology and economics.

An early usage referring to a psychiatric symptom was by French psychiatrist Louis Delasiauve in 1856, and by the 1860s it was appearing in medical dictionaries to refer to a physiological and metaphorical lowering of emotional function. Since Aristotle, melancholia had been associated with men of learning and intellectual brilliance, a hazard of contemplation and creativity. The newer concept abandoned these associations and, through the 19th century, became more associated with women.

Although melancholia remained the dominant diagnostic term, depression gained increasing currency in medical treatises and was a synonym by the end of the century; German psychiatrist Emil Kraepelin may have been the first to use it as the overarching term, referring to different kinds of melancholia as depressive states. English psychiatrist Henry Maudsley proposed an overarching category of affective disorder.

== 20th and 21st centuries ==
In the 20th century, the German psychiatrist Emil Kraepelin was the first to distinguish manic depression. The influential system put forward by Kraepelin unified nearly all types of mood disorder into manic–depressive insanity. Kraepelin worked from an assumption of underlying brain pathology, but also promoted a distinction between endogenous (internally caused) and exogenous (externally caused) types.

The unitarian view became more popular in the United Kingdom, while the binary view held sway in the US, influenced by the work of Swiss psychiatrist Adolf Meyer and before him Sigmund Freud, the father of psychoanalysis.

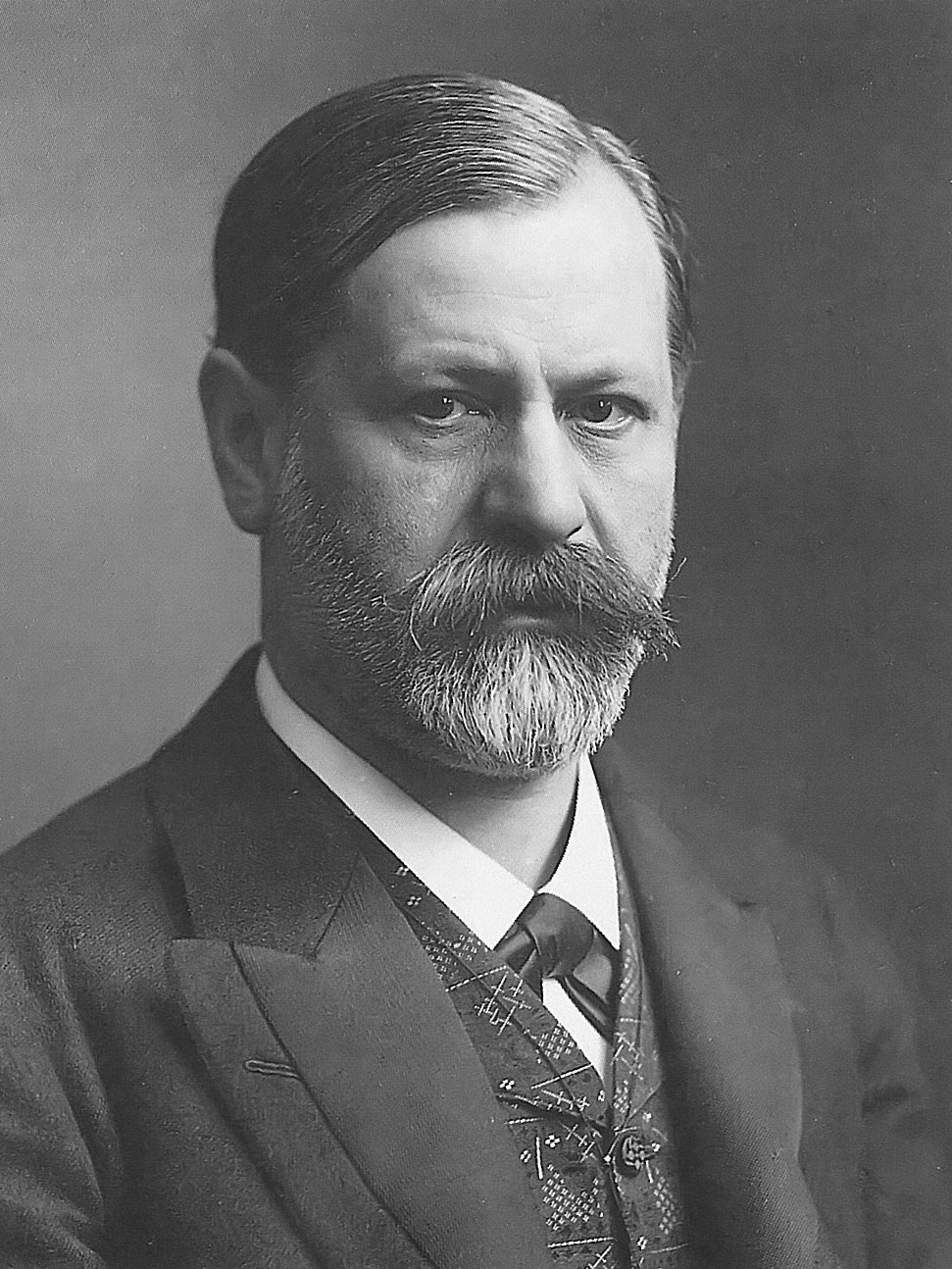
Sigmund Freud argued that depression, or melancholia, could result from loss and is more severe than mourning.

Freud had likened the state of melancholia to mourning in his 1917 paper Mourning and Melancholia. He theorized that objective loss, such as the loss of a valued relationship through death or a romantic breakup, results in subjective loss as well; the depressed individual has identified with the object of affection through an unconscious, narcissistic process called the libidinal cathexis of the ego.

Such loss results in severe melancholic symptoms more profound than mourning; not only is the outside world viewed negatively, but the ego itself is compromised. The patient's decline of self-perception is revealed in his belief of his own blame, inferiority, and unworthiness. He also emphasized early life experiences as a predisposing factor.

Meyer put forward a mixed social and biological framework emphasizing reactions in the context of an individual's life, and argued that the term depression should be used instead of melancholia.

The DSM-I (1952) contained depressive reaction and the DSM-II (1968) depressive neurosis, defined as an excessive reaction to internal conflict or an identifiable event, and also included a depressive type of manic-depressive psychosis within Major affective disorders.

In the mid-20th century, other psycho-dynamic theories were proposed. Existential and humanistic theories represented a forceful affirmation of individualism. Austrian existential psychiatrist Viktor Frankl connected depression to feelings of futility and meaninglessness. Frankl's logotherapy addressed the filling of an "existential vacuum" associated with such feelings, and may be particularly useful for depressed adolescents.

American existential psychologist Rollo May hypothesized that "depression is the inability to construct a future". In general, May wrote that depression "occur[s] more in the dimension of time than in space," and the depressed individual fails to look ahead in time properly. Thus the "focusing upon some point in time outside the depression ... gives the patient a perspective, a view on high so to speak; and this may well break the chains of the ... depression."

Humanistic psychologists argued that depression resulted from an incongruity between society and the individual's innate drive to self-actualize, or to realize one's full potential. American humanistic psychologist Abraham Maslow theorized that depression is especially likely to arise when the world precludes a sense of "richness" or "totality" for the self-actualizer.

Cognitive psychologists offered theories on depression in the mid-twentieth century. Starting in the 1950s, Albert Ellis argued that depression stemmed from irrational "should" and "musts" leading to inappropriate self-blame, self-pity, or other-pity in times of adversity. Starting in the 1960s, Aaron Beck developed the theory that depression results from a "cognitive triad" of negative thinking patterns, or "schemas," about oneself, one's future, and the world.

In the mid-20th century, researchers theorized that depression was caused by a chemical imbalance in neurotransmitters in the brain, a theory based on observations made in the 1950s of the effects of reserpine and isoniazid in altering monoamine neurotransmitter levels and affecting depressive symptoms. During the 1960s and 70s, manic-depression came to refer to just one type of mood disorder (now most commonly known as bipolar disorder) which was distinguished from (unipolar) depression. The terms unipolar and bipolar had been coined by German psychiatrist Karl Kleist.

The term major depressive disorder was introduced by a group of US clinicians in the mid-1970s as part of proposals for diagnostic criteria based on patterns of symptoms (called the Research Diagnostic Criteria, building on earlier Feighner Criteria), and was incorporated into the DSM-III in 1980. To maintain consistency the ICD-10 used the same criteria, with only minor alterations, but using the DSM diagnostic threshold to mark a mild depressive episode, adding higher threshold categories for moderate and severe episodes.

DSM-IV-TR excluded cases where the symptoms are a result of bereavement, although it was possible for normal bereavement to evolve into a depressive episode if the mood persisted and the characteristic features of a major depressive episode developed. The criteria were criticized because they do not take into account any other aspects of the personal and social context in which depression can occur. In addition, some studies found little empirical support for the DSM-IV cut-off criteria, indicating they are a diagnostic convention imposed on a continuum of depressive symptoms of varying severity and duration.

The ancient idea of melancholia still survives in the notion of a melancholic sub-type. The new definitions of depression were widely accepted, albeit with some conflicting findings and views, and the nomenclature continues in DSM-IV-TR, published in 2000.

There has been some criticism of the expansion of coverage of the diagnosis, related to the development and promotion of antidepressants and the biological model since the late 1950s.

== See also ==
- History of mental disorders
- Classification of mental disorders
