= Heavydirtysoul =

Twenty One Pilots song

Single by Twenty One Pilots

from the album Blurryface
- Released: December 9, 2016
- Genre: Alternative hip hop; rock; rap rock
- Length: 3:54
- Label: Fueled by Ramen
- Songwriter: Tyler Joseph
- Producer: Ricky Reed

Twenty One Pilots singles chronology
"Cancer" (2016)	"Heavydirtysoul" (2016)	"Jumpsuit" / "Nico and the Niners" (2018)

Music video
- "Heavydirtysoul" on YouTube

"Heavydirtysoul" is a song by American musical duo Twenty One Pilots from their fourth studio album Blurryface (2015). It was written by vocalist Tyler Joseph, who derived some of its lyrics from a poem called "Street Poetry" which he had written and published three years earlier. The track was produced by American record producer Ricky Reed and recorded at Serenity West Recording in Hollywood, California. As the opening track of Blurryface, "Heavydirtysoul" acts as the album's introduction, both musically and thematically. The song contains a self-referential statement where Joseph touches on the concept by candidly addressing its music with self-aware lyrics that give away his insecurities.

"Heavydirtysoul" is an intense, aggressive track in which the duo mix and move between several music genres. The song features high-speed vocals as Joseph rotates from complex rapping to melodic singing to falsetto screaming over soulful drumming by Josh Dun. Lyrically, "Heavydirtysoul" is about asking for help in defeating one's inner demons to become something greater. The song's lyrics convey an anthemic theme relating to self-discovery through being vulnerable.

Following the release of Blurryface, "Heavydirtysoul" subsequently became a hit song. In the United States, the song peaked at number eight on the U.S. Billboard Hot Rock & Alternative Songs chart and reached number eight on the top ten most viral tracks on Spotify. It also managed to top the alternative radio add board for the final week of 2016, becoming the most added song on the radio format. The song received universal acclaim from contemporary music critics. "Heavydirtysoul" was released as the final single from their fourth album in December of 2016.

An accompanying music video for the single was directed by Andrew Donoho and filmed outside the band's hometown, Columbus, Ohio. It features Joseph sitting in the passenger seat of an out-of-control vehicle while playing chicken with Dun and his flaming drum kit. Twenty One Pilots won the award for Best Rock Video with "Heavydirtysoul" at the 34th annual MTV Video Music Awards. "Heavydirtysoul" has since been certified 2× Platinum by the Recording Industry Association of America (RIAA) for sales of over 2,000,000 paid digital downloads.

== Background ==
Three years prior to its single release, vocalist Tyler Joseph wrote and published a short poem called "Street Poetry", and lyrics from it were partially used by Twenty One Pilots for the song "Heavydirtysoul." In 2013, Joseph was first filmed performing "Street Poetry" in the open air in London, England. The duo had been the monthly cover stars for Rock Sound and provided the British magazine with exclusive video footage. Some of the lyrics he recited on camera subsequently appeared on "Heavydirtysoul", and it was included as the first song on the band's fourth studio album Blurryface in 2015.

As the opening track, "Heavydirtysoul" acts as an introduction that unveils the fourth album, both musically and thematically. In an interview with Billboard, Tyler Joseph briefly explained "Blurryface", which was both the title of their fourth studio album as well as conceptual character who the record is centered on. According to Joseph, "Blurryface is this character that I came up with that represents a certain level of insecurity. These symbols and having a narrative give people a reason to want to take in the whole album—not just one song." By way of his alter ego, the concept album operates as a cathartic release for Joseph. He began on "Heavydirtysoul" in the song's first verse with lyrics that give away both his self-awareness and insecurities. Alongside the persona, one other primary character was the music in itself. The nature of the music is representative of the psyche of the titular character. "Heavydirtysoul" finds Joseph touching on the concept with a self-referential statement, and it was one of seven songs on the album where he seems to directly address the music.

== Recording ==
"Heavydirtysoul" was produced by Ricky Reed and recorded at Serenity West Recording in Hollywood, California. The track was then mixed at The Casita in Hollywood, California and mastered at Sterling Sound in New York City. Some of the lyrics for "Heavydirtysoul" originated from a short poem called "Street Poetry," which had been written three years earlier by Joseph. Twenty One Pilots incorporated part of its lyrics, transforming them into a fast-talking song that sports a melodic chorus. The track exemplifies the manner in which the duo mix and move between several music genres on Blurryface. Similar to their previous studio album Vessel, their fourth album was musically diverse and reflective of the wide range of Joseph and drummer Josh Dun's musical tastes. Being an introductory song, "Heavydirtysoul" served to outline the adventurous record. The opening track epitomizes the album's musical elements, containing rap verses, piano-driven refrains and erratic musical shifts. It illustrates how the duo deploy hyperactive shifts, with the song gradually developing, unraveling and going in different musical directions.

Twenty One Pilots later collaborated with New Orleans quartet Mutemath, who had been their tourmates during the Emotional Roadshow World Tour, for a live session known as The MUTEMATH Sessions. Five of their songs were repurposed with new sonics with Mutemath's assistance, giving them a more electronic, atmospheric sheen. Despite the addition of several musicians to their work, the results demonstrate more restraint. Though slight, the new versions stripped away some of the studio technology and polish of their original record production, emphasizing Joseph's vocal abilities and songwriting. Likewise, Dun was also highlighted by a number of jams and extended drum breaks alongside the quartet. The recreated "Heavydirtysoul" track exhibits breakdowns between Dun and Mutemath.

== Composition ==
"Heavydirtysoul" is an alternative hip hop song that runs for a duration of three minutes and fifty-four seconds. Within its track, the duo mesh several genres, moving between funk-tinged rock, hip-hop, grandeur pop and soul while flashing R&B hooks and experimenting with electronic dance beats. "Heavydirtysoul" is an intense, aggressive song that features high-speed vocals and complex rapping from Tyler Joseph. His rapid rapping is supplemented by soulful drumming from Josh Dun, generating its heavy beats and groove. According to the sheet music published at Musicnotes.com by Alfred Music, the song is written in the time signature of common time, with a moderately fast tempo of 130 beats per minute. "Heavydirtysoul" is composed in the key of D minor, while Tyler Joseph's vocal range spans one octave and seven notes, from a low of D_{3} to a high of C_{5}. The song is restricted to a droning chord of Dm throughout its verses and pre-chorus, changes to a basic sequence of B♭–Gm–Dm–C at the refrain and follows B♭–Gm–Dm–C/E during the bridge as its chord progression.

The musical arrangement begins with its introduction, opening with an ambient drone before quickly morphing into a hooky, memorable two-step drumbeat and Joseph's rapped vocals. Following its intro, the rousing song launches into a storm of industrial drumming beneath his speedy rapping over fast, pulsating rhythm. The track bounds into catchy breaks and cascading noise before a throbbing unease arises. The musical arrangement then shifts into a dramatic, piano-driven prechorus. For the chorus, Joseph sings atop an undercurrent of surging energy and scattered percussion. The song's tempo decreases as he starts breaking into a melodic chorus of neo-soul. Joseph invokes screaming in falsetto vocals at the gospel-inspired refrain. Throughout the "disjointed" track, the music shifts from drum and bass fills to arena-oriented choruses and lengthy bass riffs before reaching a heavy rock climax.

Lyrically, "Heavydirtysoul" is about asking for help in defeating one's inner demons in order to become something greater. During the two rap verses, Joseph frantically delivers fast-paced lyrics with quick-tempered rapping. The song's opening verse expresses a self-referential remark where Joseph candidly addresses its music. As he rotates from rapping to singing, Joseph mentions the concept with self-aware lyrics, contending, "This is not rap, this is not hip-hop / just another attempt to make the voices stop." The song's lyrics reveal that deep down, even despite knowledge of one's greatness, aid is necessary in bringing it out or else risk getting lost in thoughts. They serve to convey an anthemic theme relating to self-discovery through being vulnerable. At the chorus, Joseph desperately sings a plea, insisting, "Can you save my heavy dirty soul, for me?" Towards the end, the song's bridge incorporates a tag line harboring anthemic lyrics. Joseph's metaphoric wordplay is haunted by mortality as he sings, "Death inspires me like a dog inspires a rabbit."

== Release and promotion ==
"Heavydirtysoul" was released as a single from their fourth album Blurryface by Warner Music Canada in December 2016.

The song was released as the first on the track-listing the first picture disc of their live album Blurryface Live. Their live album was derived from a concert at Fox Oakland Theatre in Oakland, California on October 18, 2016. Twenty One Pilots decided to capture their sold-out Emotional Roadshow World Tour for posterity and closed out the year with the Thanksgiving weekend release of a live album, recorded a month prior at Fox Oakland Theater. It was released exclusively on vinyl record format as opposed to digital download or compact disc on November 25, 2016. The duo later joined with New Orleans rock quartet Mutemath, who had been their former tourmates, to create the extended play TOPxMM, also known as The MUTEMATH Sessions. A new version of "Heavydirtysoul" was included on the EP, which was made available for downloading on December 20, 2016.

== Critical reception ==
Sputnikmusic praised the song, writing, "Tyler Joseph alternates between rapping, singing, and screaming like they're all the same, and he even alludes to the idea on the curtain-opening 'Heavydirtysoul' ...Despite the music's schizophrenic nature, it's all true to the Blurryface persona – and in that sense, it's artistic." Describing it as a "rousing number," Cole Waterman from Spectrum Culture considers "Heavydirtysoul" one of the album's four best songs. Chris Willman of Variety regarded "Heavydirtysoul" as the best track from Blurryface. AllMusic's Neil Z. Yeung cites the song as one of the album's highlights. Calling the tagline one of Joseph's cleverest turns of phrase, Stereogum's Chris DeVille stated the song "morphs from some kind of late-'90s trip-hop/Big Beat thing to a Fitz and the Tantrums song to a monolithic heavy-rock climax without ever inducing whiplash." André Curcic from Renowned for Sound opined, "The track is incredibly disjointed that is what makes the track one of the best on the album. It begins with a fast, pulsating rhythm and jumps into catchy song breaks that come together to create something wonderful." Comparing its grooves to the mid-1990s works of Prodigy, Jason Pettigrew for Alternative Press claimed the track," ...successfully encapsulates all the elements fans have come to expect... 'Heavydirtysoul' is guaranteed to have crowds pogoing from Bunbury to Bonnaroo." He continued saying, "Anxious and frightened, yet trippy and badassed, the duo's blend of fearful and fierce here is stellar." Sharing similar sentiments, Anne Nickoloff and Troy Smith from The Plain Dealer remarked, "The opener 'Heavydirtysoul' sounds like The Prodigy is about to rip through your speakers, as drummer Josh Dun goes absolutely ballistic." Emily Jayne Beard from PopBuzz cites "Heavydirtysoul" as one of the songs from the album that "hook you in with [its] instantly memorable beats."

Loudwire's Chad Childers described "Heavydirtysoul" as a "pulse-pushing opener." Writing for The New Yorker, Jia Tolentino mused, "The refrain on their album opener sounds exactly like praise and worship." Scott Mervis for Pittsburgh Post-Gazette described the song as "a banger that launches with a drum rush and speed rap before breaking into a chorus of lovely neo-soul." Likewise, Madison Desler of Orange County Register deemed the track "a beat-heavy banger that features some of Joseph's most rapid-fire rapping." Stuff's Kylie Klein Nixon called the song, "a glorious street parade of cascading noise. ...It's not the lyrics they're hiding up their sleeves either. 'Heavy Dirty Soul' includes the viscerally poetic metaphor: "death inspires me like a dog inspires a rabbit," and that's the kind of wordsmithery that buys a lot of good will.” Kerrang! ranked the song's tag line as one of the band's ten best lyrics. Sam Law, from the same publication, said the song "...spectacularly walks the line between fearfulness and ferocity... Featuring one of the vocalist's most assured performances, to the contrary, 'Heavydirtysoul' is a masterclass in both, with heaps of classic pop grandeur and that titular soul loaded on for good measure. Writing for the same publication, Emily Carter characterized "Heavydirtysoul" as being a "genre-smashing single." She commented, "Opener 'Heavydirtysoul' hears the frontman rapping, 'This is not rap / This is not hip-hop / Just another attempt to make the voices stop' ...All heavy words, but ones that have helped thousands of fans worldwide – myself included – tackle important issues and emotions going on in their head."

== Commercial performance ==
In the United States, "Heavydirtysoul" entered at number thirty-one on the U.S. Billboard Hot Rock & Alternative Songs chart for the date issued June 6, 2015. Over the course of fourteen weeks, the song went up and down on the chart before eventually reaching a peak at number twenty-nine for the date issued September 26, 2015. Over the next six weeks, "Heavydirtysoul" declined several spots before falling off the chart completely after occupying the thirty-fourth position on the date issued November 7, 2015. "Heavydirtysoul" re-entered the Hot Rock & Alternative Songs chart at number twelve on the issue date January 14, 2017. The song peaked at number eight on the chart for the date issued February 25, 2017. The song also entered and peaked at number twenty-five on the U.S. Billboard Bubbling Under Hot 100 for same date issued March 4, 2017, spending one week on the chart.

Following the release of its parent album, "Heavydirtysoul" subsequently became a hit song. In the United States, it reached number eight on the top ten most viral tracks on streaming platform Spotify. The list represents the most viral tracks based on the number of people who shared and listened to them, from May 25 to May 31, through social media outlets Facebook, Tumblr, Twitter and Spotify. "Heavydirtysoul" managed to top the final alternative radio add board of 2016. It claimed the top spot to become the most added song on alternative radio add board for the week. The song was added by eleven radio stations monitored by Mediabase for that week. On March 1, 2018, "Heavydirtysoul" was certified platinum by the Recording Industry Association of America (RIAA) for sales of over 1,000,000 paid digital downloads.

== Music video ==
The accompanying music video for "Heavydirtysoul" was directed by Andrew Donoho and filmed outside the band's hometown, Columbus, Ohio. The video features Tyler Joseph sitting in the passenger seat of an out-of-control vehicle being driven by Nico (Blurryface) that is playing chicken with Josh Dun and his flaming drum kit.

The music video for "Heavydirtysoul" was released by Twenty One Pilots on February 3, 2017. The duo brought their Blurryface era to a conclusion by finishing off the year with the release of the video. They provided fans with the opportunity to view how they made their music video. Following the debut of the video for "Heavydirtysoul", the duo released a "Beyond the video' behind-the-scenes experience. It portrays Joseph and Dun getting up at dawn in freezing temperatures to make the video.

=== Reception ===
Jason Pettigrew of Alternative Press praised the music video, remarking, "Anxious and frightened, yet trippy and badassed, the duo’s blend of fearful and fierce here is stellar. We’re just glad Joseph can take limousines and not the crappy Uber driving him in this video." Kerrang!'s Sam Law regarded the music video as "yet another unforgettable stand-out."

Twenty One Pilots received a nomination and subsequently won the award for Best Rock Video with "Heavydirtysoul" at the 34th annual MTV Video Music Awards in 2017. Fans were able to vote online for nominees in the eight VMA categories, with the winner being awarded during the telecast that aired from The Forum in Inglewood, California on August 27, 2017. It was following a year of success and accolades for the duo, who had been forecast to win their second consecutive VMA for Best Rock Video.

== Live performances ==
Twenty One Pilots did a live rendition of "Heavydirtysoul" while performing for the very first time in Singapore at the Suntec City's Convention Centre on July 16, 2015. Despite Joseph being ill with a throat infection and having to cancel a concert in Taipei City prior, the duo managed to show up to deliver a live performance. After the stage lights dimmed and the two took their places, the pair initiated the set with "Heavydirtysoul," wearing in their trademark black hoodies and skeleton masks. The band performed "Heavydirtysoul" as the opener of a concert held at Comerica Theatre in Downtown Phoenix, Arizona on October 14, 2015. Once they began, a vast majority of the audience started to sing along closely to the song's lyrics. The duo gave a live performance of "Heavydirtysoul" at the Aragon Ballroom when WKQX hosted the first of its four "Nights We Stole Christmas" concerts on December 3, 2015. Despite its complexity, the audience managed to rap and sing along to every word of the song. Twenty One Pilots provided a live rendition of "Heavydirtysoul" as their opening performance during a concert at UNSW Roundhouse in Sydney, Australia on April 20, 2016. With the lower half of their faces half-covered in balaclava, Joseph wielded a tambourine and Dun played drums throughout the song before slowing down and segueing into a performance of "Stressed Out."

== Usage in media ==
"Heavydirtysoul" was included in the sixteenth edition of the American football video game series Madden NFL, in Madden 16, released on PlayStation 3, PlayStation 4, Xbox 360 and Xbox One through Electronic Arts. According to executive Steve Schnur: "For the last few years, our Madden soundtracks focused on recreating the stadium experience. But with Madden 16, we’ve returned to our roots for introducing new artists and new music." "Heavydirtysoul" was among numerous other songs in the Madden 16 tracklist that were added to a playlist on Spotify. "Heavydirtysoul" was also one of the eleven songs featured on the companion soundtrack of the professional wrestling video game WWE 2K16. The company 2K revealed the details for the soundtrack of the WWE video game on Apple Music's Beats 1 during their "Release" program on August 14, 2015. The WWE 2K16 soundtrack was made available for streaming on Apple Music. "Heavydirtysoul" also appears on the soundtrack for Madden 25.

== Track listing ==
Digital download
No.	Title	Length
1.	"Heavydirtysoul"	3:54

CD single
No.	Title	Length
1.	"Heavydirtysoul"	3:54
2.	"Heavydirtysoul" (instrumental)	3:54
3.	"Heavydirtysoul" (radio edit)	3:19
4.	"Heavydirtysoul" (TV track)	3:54
5.	"Heavydirtysoul" (a cappella)	3:54

== Personnel ==
Credits adapted from Blurryface album liner notes.

- Tyler Joseph – vocals, songwriting, programming, piano
- Josh Dun – drums, percussion
- Ricky Reed – producer, programming, additional vocals
- Drew Kapner – audio engineer
- Michael Peterson – assistant audio engineer
- Neal Avron – audio mixing
- Scott Skrzynski – audio mixing assistant
- Chris Gheringer – mastering

== Charts ==
=== Weekly charts ===
Chart (2015–17)	Peak position
Belgium (Ultratop 50 Flanders)	42
Belgium (Ultratip Bubbling Under Wallonia)	18
Canada Rock (Billboard)	13
Russia Airplay (Tophit)	82
US Bubbling Under Hot 100 (Billboard)	25
US Hot Rock & Alternative Songs (Billboard)	8
US Rock & Alternative Airplay (Billboard)	4

=== Year-end charts ===
Chart (2015)	Position
US Hot Rock Songs (Billboard)	63
Chart (2017)	Position
US Hot Rock Songs (Billboard)	22
US Rock Airplay (Billboard)	22

== Certifications ==
Region	Certification	Certified units/sales
Canada (Music Canada)	2× Platinum	160,000^{‡}
Italy (FIMI)	Gold	25,000^{‡}
New Zealand (RMNZ)	Gold	15,000^{‡}
Poland (ZPAV)	Platinum	20,000^{‡}
United Kingdom (BPI)	Gold	400,000^{‡}
United States (RIAA)	2× Platinum	2,000,000^{‡}
^{‡} Sales+streaming figures based on certification alone.
