= BMI Foundation =

American nonprofit organization

Logo of the BMI Foundation

The BMI Foundation, Inc. is a non-profit organization founded in 1985 by executives of Broadcast Music Incorporated for the purpose of "encouraging the creation, performance and study of music through awards, scholarships, internships, grants, and commissions." Additionally, the Foundation makes grants annually to other not-for-profit musical organizations. The organization is currently headed by Deirdre Chadwick who serves as the President and an elected Board of Directors.

Awards programs include:

- BMI Student Composer Awards for Classical Compositions
- Peermusic Latin Scholarships
- Carlos Surinach Awards and Commissions
- Woody Guthrie Fellowships
- Women's Music Commission
- John Lennon Scholarships
- Milton Adolphus award
- Charlie Parker Jazz Composition Prize
- Jerry Harrington Musical Theater Award
- Jerry Bock Musical Theater Award
- Robert B. Sherman Scholarship
- David N. Baker Jazz Composition Scholarship, Indiana University Jacobs School of Music
