= Adam Hawkins =

American recording and mix engineer

- Born: 1976 (age 49–50); New Jersey, U.S.
- Genres: Rock; pop; country
- Occupations: Mixing engineer; recording engineer; record producer
- Years active: 1999–present
- Website: adamhawkins.com

Adam Hawkins (born 1976) is an American recording and mix engineer. He is best known for his extensive collaborations in the rock space with Twenty One Pilots, Turnstile, Travis Barker, Pierce the Veil, Avril Lavigne, Yungblud, Machine Gun Kelly, and Switchfoot amid a diverse range of other mixes for Ed Sheeran, Sia, Ella Langley, Regina Spektor, Britney Spears, Brothers Osborne, Demi Lovato, Tegan and Sara, Kane Brown, and P!NK among others.

He earned his first Grammy Award in 2011 for his work on Switchfoot's Hello Hurricane, and brought home another in 2026 for mixing Turnstile's 5x nominated album Never Enough.

== Select discography ==
Credits adapted from AllMusic

Year	Artist	Title	Credit	
Year	Artist	Title	Mix	Engineer
2026	Hilary Duff	"Come Clean (Mine)"	check	
2026	Freya Skye	Stardust EP	check	
2026	Nick Jonas	"Gut Punch"	check	
2025	Twenty One Pilots	"Drag Path"	check	
2025	Turnstile	Never Enough	check	
2025	Yellowcard × Good Charlotte	"Bedroom Posters"	check	
2025	Twenty One Pilots	Breach	check	
2025	Yellowcard	Better Days	check	
2025	Good Charlotte	"Fairytale of New York"	check	
2025	Freya Skye	"Silent Treatment"	check	
2025	Ella Langley	"Never Met Anyone Like You"	check	
2024	Twenty One Pilots	Clancy	check	
2024	Various artists	Arcane: League of Legends Season 2 ("Heavy Is The Crown", "The Line", "Paint The Town Blue", "Cocktail Molotov")	check	
2024	Twenty One Pilots	"Doubt (Demo)"	check	
2024	Sheryl Crow	Evolution	check	
2024	Incubus	Morning View XXIII	check	
2023	Pierce the Veil	The Jaws of Life	check	
2023	Blink-182	One More Time... ("All In My Head", "No Fun", "More Than You'll Ever Know", "Dance With Me", "Anthem Pt. 3" et al.)	check	
2023	Brothers Osborne	Brothers Osborne	check	
2023	Yungblud	"Hated", "Lowlife"	check	
2022	Demi Lovato	Holy Fvck ("Holy Fvck", "Freak", "Wasted", "Come Together")	check	
2022	Kane Brown	"Grand"	check	
2022	Blackbear, Machine Gun Kelly	"GFY"	check	
2022	Blackbear	"The Idea"	check	
2022	Machine Gun Kelly	Mainstream Sellout (incl. "Emo Girl", "Maybe", "Papercuts")	check	
2022	Avril Lavigne	"Bois Lie" ft. Machine Gun Kelly	check	
2021	Twenty One Pilots	Scaled and Icy	check	
2021	Turnstile	Glow On	check	
2021	Rag'n'Bone Man	Life by Misadventure	check	
2021	Brittany Howard	"You'll Never Walk Alone"	check	
2021	Avril Lavigne	"Bite Me"	check	
2020	Machine Gun Kelly	Tickets to My Downfall	check	
2020	Twenty One Pilots	"Level of Concern"	check	
2020	Britney Spears	"Swimming in the Stars"	check	
2020	Yungblud ft. Machine Gun Kelly and Travis Barker	"Acting Like That"	check	
2020	Machine Gun Kelly	"Concert for Aliens"	check	
2020	Yungblud	"Lemonade"	check	
2019	Goo Goo Dolls	Miracle Pill	check	
2019	Switchfoot	Native Tongue	check	
2019	Yungblud	The Underrated Youth EP ("Braindead!", "Casual Sabotage")	check	
2019	Switchfoot	"Let it Happen"	check	
2019	Albert Hammond Jr.	"More to Life"	check	
2019	I'm With Her	"Call My Name"	check	
2018	Muse	Simulation Theory ("Thought Contagion", "Pressure", "Blockades")	check	check
2018	5 Seconds of Summer	"Youngblood"	check	
2018	Hayley Kiyoko	Expectations ("Feelings", "Curious")	check	
2018	Twenty One Pilots	Trench	check	
2018	Muse	"Dig Down"		check
2017	K Flay	Every Where Is Some Where	check	check
2017	Walk the Moon	What If Nothing	check	check
2017	Ed Sheeran	"Galway Girl"		check
2016	Twenty One Pilots	"Heathens"	check	check
2016	Sia	"Satisfied"	check	
2016	Various artists	The Hamilton Mixtape ("My Shot" – The Roots; "Burn" – Andra Day)	check	check
2015	Twenty One Pilots	Blurryface		check
2015	Jennifer Lawrence	"The Hanging Tree (Alt Radio Mix)"	check	check
2014	Switchfoot	Fading West		check
2014	Switchfoot	The Edge of the Earth	check	check
2014	Tegan and Sara	Heart Throb		check
2014	Keith Urban	Fuse		check
2012	Regina Spektor	What We Saw from the Cheap Seats	check	check
2012	Gary Clark Jr.	Blak and Blu	check	check
2011	Kimbra	Vows		check
2011	Switchfoot	Vice Verses		check
2010	Alanis Morissette	Prince of Persia soundtrack		check
2009	Switchfoot	Hello Hurricane	check	check
2009	Regina Spektor	Far	check	check
2009	Kate Voegele	A Fine Mess	check	check
2009	Pink	P!nk Box	check	check
2009	Eminem	Relapse		check
2008	Natasha Bedingfield	"Pocketful of Sunshine"		check
2007	Maroon 5	It Won't Be Soon Before Long		check
2007	Natasha Bedingfield	N.B.	check	check
2006	Pink	I'm Not Dead	check	check
2006	Fiona Apple	The Nightmare Before Christmas	check	check
2005	50 Cent	The Massacre		check
2005	Jason Mraz	Mr. A–Z		check
2005	Alice Cooper	Dirty Diamonds		check
2005	Fiona Apple	Extraordinary Machine		check
2005	Alanis Morissette	"Wunderkind" from The Chronicles of Narnia: The Lion, the Witch and the Wardrobe Soundtrack		check
2004	Rod Stewart	Stardust: The Great American Songbook, Volume III		check
2003	Nelly Furtado	Folklore		check
2003	50 Cent	"P.I.M.P." (Remix)		check
2000	Limp Bizkit	Chocolate Starfish and the Hot Dog Flavored Water		check

== Grammy Awards ==
Hawkins is a two-time Grammy winner for his work on Turnstile's 2026 album Never Enough and Switchfoot's 2010 album Hello Hurricane. He has also contributed to the following Grammy recognized works.

Year	Category	Artist	Nominated Work	Result
2026	Best Rock Album	Turnstile	Never Enough	Won
2026	Best Rock Song	Turnstile	Never Enough	Nominated
2026	Best Metal Performance	Turnstile	Never Enough	Won
2026	Best Rock Performance	Turnstile	Never Enough	Nominated
2026	Best Alternative Music Performance	Turnstile	Never Enough	Nominated
2023	Best Rock Album	MGK	Mainstream Sellout	Nominated
2023	Best Rock Performance	Turnstile	Glow On	Nominated
2023	Best Metal Performance	Turnstile	Glow On	Nominated
2023	Best Rock Song	Turnstile	Glow On	Nominated
2020	Best American Roots Song	I'm With Her	"Call My Name"	Won
2020	Best American Roots Performance	I'm With Her	"Call My Name"	Nominated
2017	Record of the Year	Twenty One Pilots	Blurryface	Nominated
2017	Best Rock Song	Twenty One Pilots	Blurryface	Nominated
2017	Best Song Written for Visual Media	Twenty One Pilots	Blurryface	Nominated
2017	Best Pop Duo/Group Performance	Twenty One Pilots	Blurryface	Nominated
2017	Best Rock Performance	Twenty One Pilots	Blurryface	Nominated
2012	Best Country Duo/Group Performance	Keith Urban	Fuse	Nominated
2012	Best Country Solo Performance	Keith Urban	Fuse	Nominated
2012	Best Traditional R&B Performance	Gary Clark Jr.	Blak and Blu	Won
2012	Best Rock Song	Gary Clark Jr.	Blak and Blu	Nominated
2011	Best Rock Gospel Album	Switchfoot	Hello Hurricane	Won
