= The Icy Tour =

2022 concert tour by Twenty One Pilots

- Tour by Twenty One Pilots
- Promotional poster
- Location: North America
- Associated album: Scaled and Icy
- Start date: August 18, 2022
- End date: September 24, 2022
- Legs: 1
- No. of shows: 23
- Supporting act: Peter McPoland

Twenty One Pilots concert chronology
- Takeover Tour (2021–2022); Icy Tour (2022); The Clancy World Tour (2024–2025)

The Icy Tour (or simply Icy Tour) was the eighth concert tour by musical duo Twenty One Pilots, in support of their sixth studio album, Scaled and Icy (2021). The tour spanned 22 dates throughout the United States and Canada, starting on August 18, 2022, at the Xcel Energy Center in St. Paul, and concluding on September 24, 2022, at the Climate Pledge Arena in Seattle.

== Background ==
On November 19, 2021, following the success of the Takeover Tour, the band announced a more traditional arena tour to take place in 2022. The Icy Tour had dates across most regions of the United States, alongside two shows in Canada. The tour's setlist, stage design, and promotion shared many similarities with the Takeover Tour. On May 9, it was announced on the band's Twitter account that singer Peter McPoland would be the sole opening act for the tour.

== Setlist ==
The setlist is from the concert that took place on September 4, 2022, in Charlotte. It may not be indicative of every date's set.

1. "Good Day" / "No Chances"
2. "Guns for Hands"
3. "Morph" / "Holding On to You"
4. "The Outside"
5. "Message Man"
6. "Lane Boy" (with interpolation of "Nico and the Niners" and "Redecorate")
7. "Chlorine"
8. "Mulberry Street"
9. "Addict with a Pen" / "Forest" / "Ode to Sleep" / "Hometown" / "Bandito" / "Choker"
10. "The Judge"
11. "Migraine"
12. "The Hype" / "Nico and the Niners" / "Tear in My Heart"
13. "House of Gold" / "We Don't Believe What's on TV"
14. "Jumpsuit"
15. "Heavydirtysoul"
16. "My Blood" / "Saturday"
17. "Level of Concern"
18. "Ride"
19. "Shy Away"
20. "Car Radio"
21. "Stressed Out"

Encore

1. "Heathens"
2. "Trees"

== Tour dates ==
List of concerts showing date, city, country, venue, opening act, attendance, and gross revenue
Date	City	Country	Venue	Opening acts	Attendance	Revenue
August 18, 2022	Saint Paul	United States	Xcel Energy Center	Peter McPoland	12,030	$956,805
August 20, 2022	Detroit	United States	Little Caesars Arena	Peter McPoland	14,261	$1,255,050
August 21, 2022	Cincinnati	United States	Heritage Bank Center	Peter McPoland	—	—
August 23, 2022	New York City	United States	Madison Square Garden	Peter McPoland	13,818	$1,187,504
August 24, 2022	Elmont	United States	UBS Arena	Peter McPoland	8,625	$691,516
August 26, 2022	Montreal	Canada	Bell Centre	Peter McPoland	11,042	$772,047
August 27, 2022	Toronto	Canada	Scotiabank Arena	Peter McPoland	12,980	$965,391
August 30, 2022	Cleveland	United States	Rocket Mortgage FieldHouse	Peter McPoland	—	—
August 31, 2022	Pittsburgh	United States	PPG Paints Arena	Peter McPoland	9,736	$706,570
September 2, 2022	Philadelphia	United States	Wells Fargo Center	Peter McPoland	—	—
September 3, 2022	Washington, D.C.	United States	Capital One Arena	Peter McPoland	13,096	$1,124,782
September 4, 2022	Charlotte	United States	Spectrum Center	Peter McPoland	—	—
September 7, 2022	Nashville	United States	Bridgestone Arena	Peter McPoland	12,972	$1,060,734
September 9, 2022	Kansas City	United States	T-Mobile Center	Peter McPoland	—	—
September 10, 2022	St. Louis	United States	Enterprise Center	Peter McPoland	—	—
September 13, 2022	Dallas	United States	American Airlines Center	Peter McPoland	12,928	$1,207,312
September 14, 2022	Houston	United States	Toyota Center	Peter McPoland	—	—
September 16, 2022	Phoenix	United States	Footprint Center	Peter McPoland	12,478	$1,189,750
September 17, 2022	Anaheim	United States	Honda Center	Peter McPoland	12,620	$1,285,115
September 18, 2022	San Francisco	United States	Chase Center	Peter McPoland	11,823	$1,141,953
September 20, 2022	Salt Lake City	United States	Vivint Arena	Peter McPoland	—	—
September 22, 2022	Portland	United States	Moda Center	Peter McPoland	11,093	$877,514
September 24, 2022	Seattle	United States	Climate Pledge Arena	Peter McPoland	13,598	$1,299,623
Total					251,100	$21,501,666
