= Takeover Tour =

2021–22 concert tour by Twenty One Pilots

- Tour by Twenty One Pilots
- Promotional poster
- Location: North America; Europe
- Associated album: Scaled and Icy
- Start date: September 21, 2021
- End date: June 25, 2022
- Legs: 2
- No. of shows: 27
- Supporting acts: Half Alive; Arrested Youth; Jay Joseph

Twenty One Pilots concert chronology
- The Bandito Tour (2018–19); Takeover Tour (2021–22); The Icy Tour (2022)

The Takeover Tour (stylized in all caps as THE TAKEØVER TØUR) was the seventh concert tour by the American musical duo Twenty One Pilots, in support of their sixth studio album Scaled and Icy (2021). The tour began at the Bluebird Theater in Denver on September 21, 2021, and concluded at Wembley Arena in London on June 25, 2022.

== Background and promotion ==
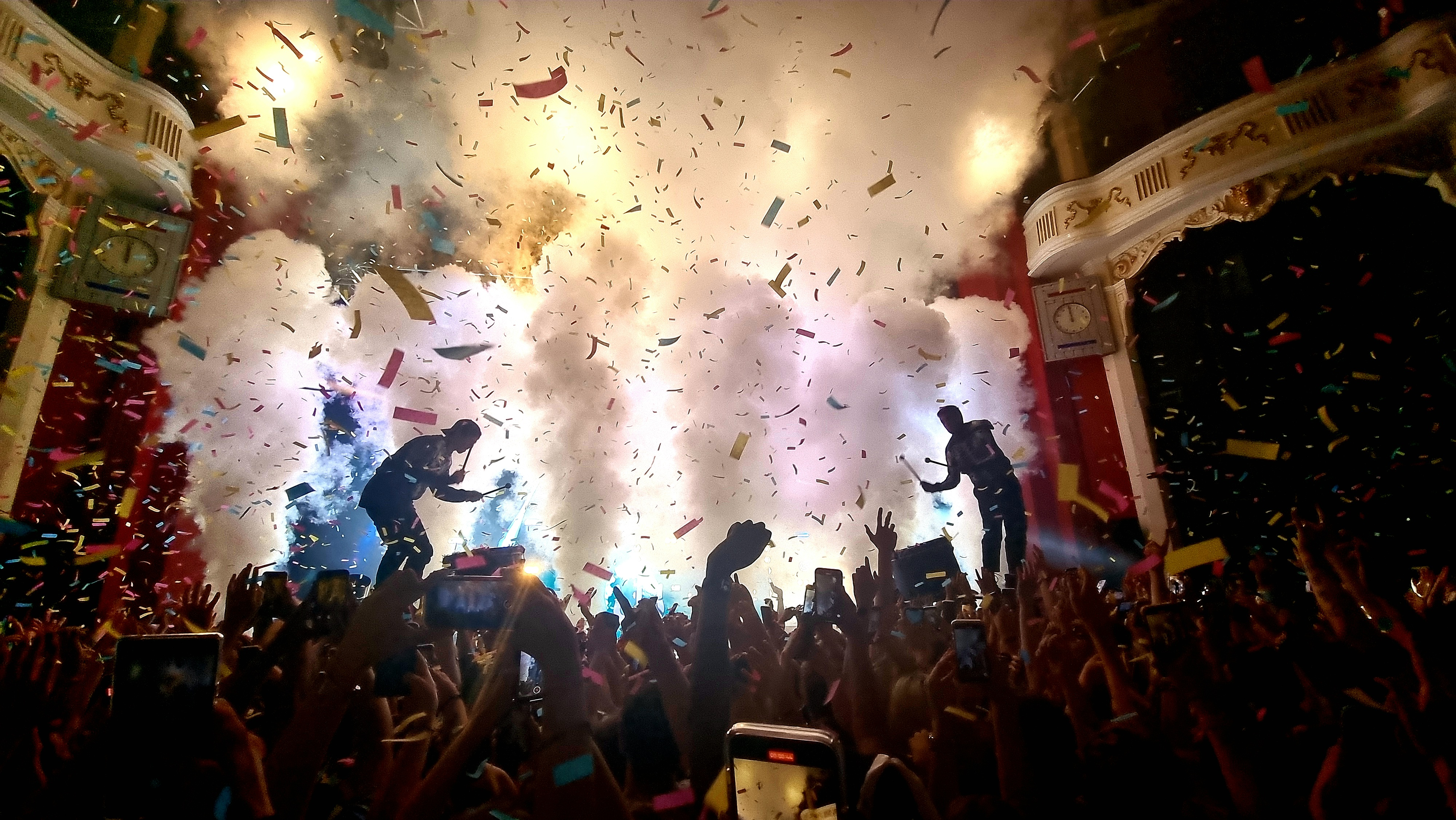
Twenty One Pilots performing during the Takeover Tour in 2022

On June 16, 2021, the band announced a residency-style, step-up tour, following the format of Tour De Columbus in the Emotional Roadshow World Tour, where they performed in small-scale venues first, and then worked their way up to large-scale venues. They announced stops in Denver, Los Angeles, Chicago, Boston, and Atlanta. Additionally, they announced two shows at Nationwide Arena in their hometown of Columbus, Ohio. Due to high demand, a third show was added. On July 23, 2021, the artists Half Alive, Arrested Youth and Jay Joseph were announced as openers for the U.S. leg of the tour. Mexico City was also announced, where they had performed at Corona Capital.

== Set list ==
This set list is from the concert on October 30, 2021, in Columbus. It is not intended to represent all shows from the tour.

1. "Good Day"
2. "No Chances"
3. "Stressed Out"
4. "Migraine" / "Morph" / "Holding On to You"
5. "Heathens"
6. "The Outside"
7. "Message Man"
8. "Lane Boy"
9. "Chlorine"
10. "Mulberry Street"
11. "Bennie and the Jets" (Elton John cover)
12. "Redecorate"
13. "Jumpsuit"
14. "Heavydirtysoul"
15. "My Blood"
16. "Never Take It"
17. "Formidable" / "Doubt" / "Tear in My Heart"
18. "I Can See Clearly Now" / "My Girl" / "Home" (Johnny Nash, The Temptations, and Edward Sharpe and the Magnetic Zeros cover medley)
19. "House of Gold" / "We Don't Believe What's on TV"
20. "Saturday"
21. "Level of Concern"
22. "Ride"
23. "Car Radio"

Encore

23. "Shy Away" / "I'm Not Okay (I Promise)" (My Chemical Romance cover)
24. "Trees"

== Tour dates ==
List of North American concerts showing date, city, country, venue, opening act, attendance, and gross revenue
| Date | City | Country | Venue | Opening acts | Attendance | Revenue |
|---|---|---|---|---|---|---|
| September 21, 2021 | Denver | United States | Bluebird Theater | Half Alive; Arrested Youth | — | — |
| September 22, 2021 | Denver | United States | Ogden Theatre | Half Alive; Arrested Youth | — | — |
| September 23, 2021 | Denver | United States | Mission Ballroom | Half Alive; Arrested Youth | — | — |
| September 25, 2021 | Denver | United States | Ball Arena | Half Alive; Arrested Youth | — | — |
| September 28, 2021 | West Hollywood | United States | Troubadour | Half Alive; Arrested Youth | — | — |
| September 29, 2021 | Los Angeles | United States | Wiltern Theatre | Half Alive; Arrested Youth | — | — |
| September 30, 2021 | Los Angeles | United States | Greek Theatre | Half Alive; Arrested Youth | — | — |
| October 2, 2021 | Inglewood | United States | The Forum | Half Alive; Arrested Youth | 13,745 / 13,745 | $1,168,755 |
| October 12, 2021 | Chicago | United States | Bottom Lounge | Half Alive; Arrested Youth | — | — |
| October 13, 2021 | Chicago | United States | House of Blues Chicago | Half Alive; Arrested Youth | — | — |
| October 14, 2021 | Chicago | United States | Aragon Ballroom | Half Alive; Arrested Youth | — | — |
| October 16, 2021 | Chicago | United States | United Center | Half Alive; Arrested Youth | — | — |
| October 18, 2021 | Boston | United States | Paradise Rock Club | Half Alive; Jay Joseph | — | — |
| October 19, 2021 | Boston | United States | House of Blues Boston | Half Alive; Jay Joseph | — | — |
| October 20, 2021 | Boston | United States | Agganis Arena | Half Alive; Jay Joseph | — | — |
| October 23, 2021 | Boston | United States | TD Garden | Half Alive; Jay Joseph | — | — |
| October 27, 2021 | Columbus | United States | Nationwide Arena | Half Alive; Jay Joseph | — | — |
| October 29, 2021 | Columbus | United States | Nationwide Arena | Half Alive; Jay Joseph | — | — |
| October 30, 2021 | Columbus | United States | Nationwide Arena | Half Alive; Jay Joseph | — | — |
| November 2, 2021 | Atlanta | United States | Center Stage Theater | Jay Joseph | — | — |
| November 3, 2021 | Atlanta | United States | Tabernacle | Jay Joseph | — | — |
| November 4, 2021 | Atlanta | United States | Coca-Cola Roxy | Jay Joseph | — | — |
| November 6, 2021 | Atlanta | United States | State Farm Arena | Jay Joseph | — | — |

List of European concerts showing date, city, country, venue, opening act, attendance, and gross revenue
| Date | City | Country | Venue | Opening acts | Attendance | Revenue |
|---|---|---|---|---|---|---|
| June 21, 2022 | London | England | Camden Assembly | Half Alive | — | — |
| June 22, 2022 | London | England | O_{2} Shepherd's Bush Empire | Half Alive | — | — |
| June 23, 2022 | London | England | O_{2} Brixton Academy | Half Alive | — | — |
| June 25, 2022 | London | England | The OVO Arena, Wembley | Half Alive | — | — |
