= Scaled and Icy =

Studio album by Twenty One Pilots
- Released: May 21, 2021
- Recorded: July 2020 – April 2021
- Studios: Tyler Joseph's home studio (Columbus, Ohio); Phantom Studios (Gallatin, Tennessee)
- Genres: Alternative pop; alternative rock; pop; rock; rap; synth-pop
- Length: 37:42
- Labels: Fueled by Ramen; Elektra
- Producers: Tyler Joseph; Mike Elizondo; Greg Kurstin; Paul Meany

Twenty One Pilots chronology
Trench (2018)	Scaled and Icy (2021)	Clancy (2024)

Livestream Version cover art

Singles from Scaled and Icy
- 1. "Shy Away" Released: April 7, 2021; 2. "Choker" Released: April 30, 2021; 3. "Saturday" Released: May 18, 2021; 4. "The Outside" Released: November 24, 2021

Scaled and Icy is the sixth studio album by the American musical duo Twenty One Pilots, released on May 21, 2021, through Fueled by Ramen and Elektra. Its title is a play on "scaled back and isolated", a phrase frontman Tyler Joseph associated with music produced during the COVID-19 pandemic, though the title is also an anagram of "Clancy is dead", a reference to the protagonist of the duo's previous studio album, Trench (2018). The album received generally positive reviews from critics.

A livestream album version of Scaled and Icy which additionally contain exclusive livestream version tracks originating from the associated "Livestream Experience" was released on November 19, 2021, five days before the release of the album's fourth and final single "The Outside".

== Background and production ==
On March 4, 2019, five months after the release of their fifth studio album Trench (2018), the band confirmed that they were working on their next studio album. About the possible theme, frontman Joseph said, "There's a character that hasn't been talked about on any record yet that plays a huge role in the narrative that obviously will need to be talked about and it's probably where we're going next". On April 9, 2020, the duo released the song "Level of Concern", which marked the first musical output by the duo since the release of Trench. The song encourages the listener to keep hope during hard times, specifically alluding to the COVID-19 pandemic. In a May 2020 interview with Zane Lowe, Joseph expressed uncertainty as to whether their next album would continue Trench's narrative or would be an "in-between record", explaining: "It's kind of hard for me to tap into the story of Trench and what we've been building on up until that point without being out there, without touring, without having those live shows, without interacting with our fans."

Scaled and Icy was written and largely produced by Joseph in his home studio over a year-long period during the COVID-19 pandemic, while drummer Josh Dun engineered the drum tracks remotely. The band had initially planned on embarking on a "victory lap" tour of arenas and festivals to draw the album cycle for Trench to a close, but the pandemic had instead left them with more free time than they were accustomed to. Joseph recalled being faced with two potential directions for the album when its writing process began in 2020, either to "lean into what [he] felt like everyone was feeling, this ominous world is ending feel", or to "kind of escape from that feeling", eventually choosing the latter approach. Dun had revealed in November 2020 that they were still working "remotely" on the album, with both members being in different locations during the time. He describes the recording process, "we both have our own studios, which is really nice, so he comes up with a lot of stuff at his studio, sends it over to me, and then I come up with some stuff here at my studio and then send it back".

Scaled and Icy is the first Twenty One Pilots album to involve Joseph's youngest brother, Jay, who provided backing vocals alongside five of his close friends on "Never Take It", "Bounce Man" and "No Chances".

== Title and artwork ==
Official logo for Scaled and Icy. Each song released for the album features its own unique styling and font.

The album's title is a play on "scaled back and isolated", a phrase frontman Tyler Joseph associated with the COVID-19 pandemic and its impact on the music produced at the time. On an interview with SiriusXM, he stated that he wanted to "lean into being aware that things are scaled back and that we're isolated". Despite that, Joseph's goal was to create an album that contrasts this very idea and that conveys the opposite of it. The album title is also an anagram of "Clancy is dead", a reference to the protagonist of their previous album, Trench; the band has however neither described this as coincidental nor declined to comment on this subject. The title's initials appear on the cover art for their 2020 single "Christmas Saves the Year", on which the sentence "SAI is propaganda" is written in purple on one of the wrapped gifts.

"It really is the power of creativity, the power of imagination and, ultimately, the power of music. And that's something that I'm experimenting with on this record."

— Tyler Joseph, discussing Trash the dragon on BBC Radio 1

The cover artwork for Scaled and Icy was designed by Brandon Rike, who also designed the cover art for Trench and Blurryface (2015). It features a scaled, teal dragon breathing yellow fire over a pink background, as well as a psi symbol in the top right corner. The dragon, featured in Scaled and Icy music videos in a CGI form, is named Trash, and represents "inspiration, fear, and magic"; Joseph explained that he wanted to "tie the songs to something as powerful as that". The creature was originally drawn by British illustrator Walter Crane in a children's book from the 1860s (the artwork is in the public domain, allowing the band to use it in the album cover). Its usage was also inspired by a small dragon figurine Joseph keeps in his home studio, with Joseph revealing to BBC Radio 1 that it represented an idea that if he were to focus on a single detail of a small room, "then that detail can then come to life".

== Composition ==
Scaled and Icy has been described as, "at first listen, the most upbeat and optimistic the band have sounded since they first emerged in 2009", which Joseph explained is a reaction against the "strange and bleak conditions" caused by the COVID-19 pandemic, during which the album was recorded. Critics specifically noted its departure from the darker approach of Trench and Blurryface and a return to the "playful alt-pop sound" of Vessel (2013), with Joseph stating that the record is a "bit of a reaction to Trench". The album has also been described as alternative rock, pop, rock, rap and synth-pop, with elements of electro.

Although a departure from the conceptual narrative found on Trench, the band largely continues to examine serious themes on Scaled and Icy despite its upbeat sound. Joseph explained that the contrast was deliberate, stating that "as you dive into lyrics, a lot of times it's asking some pretty heavy questions and addressing some pretty heavy things". Neil Z. Yeung of AllMusic described the album as "a snapshot of the emotional highs and lows of quarantine life", while Augusta Battoclette of Alternative Press noted the themes of "anxiety, doubt and the need to keep your loved ones close".

== Tours ==
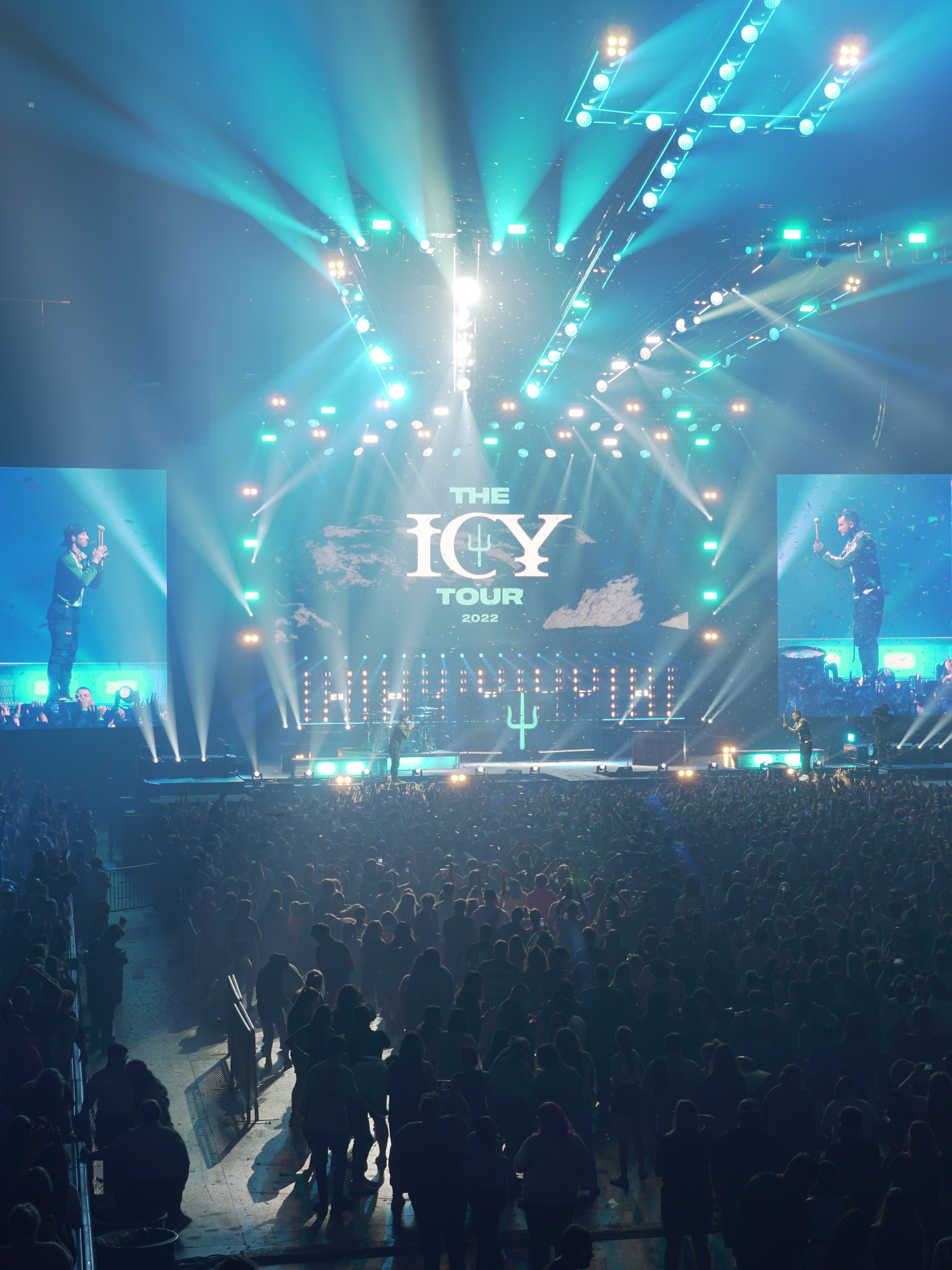
Twenty One Pilots performing during the Icy Tour in St. Louis, 2022

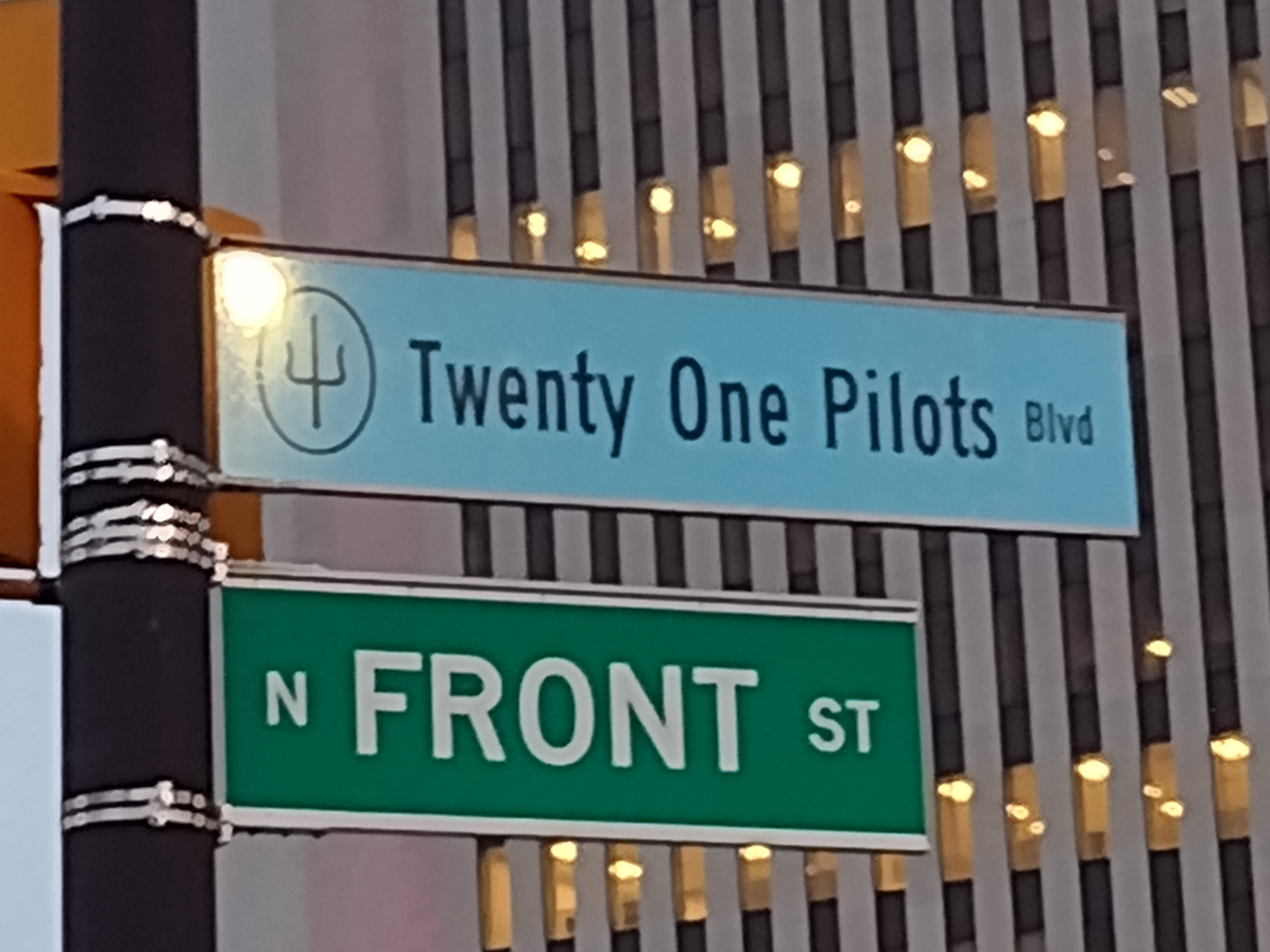
For a short while, Nationwide Boulevard was renamed to Twenty One Pilots Boulevard in celebration of the Columbus shows of the Takeover Tour

On June 16, 2021, Twenty One Pilots announced the Takeover Tour, consisting of 35 shows in which they would spend one week in each city to perform at small clubs as well as large venues. The tour began on September 21, 2021, in Denver, Colorado, and concluded on June 25, 2022, in London.

On November 18, 2021, the band announced a second tour of North America in support of the album called the Icy Tour, which began on August 18, 2022, in Saint Paul, Minnesota, and concluded on September 24 in Seattle, Washington. It consisted of 23 shows.

== Release and promotion ==
The duo began teasing the era in January 2021 by updating their social media headers with an orange-tinged photo of the duo in an empty venue, the band's Trench era logo placed between them. The following month, Joseph posted a selfie to his Instagram story featuring a blue psi symbol over his right eye. On April 2, 2021, a progress bar appeared on dmaorg.info—a website the band uses to share background stories and lore—which appeared to be deleting files. When the progress bar timed out three days later, three posters appeared on the page announcing a new album titled Scaled and Icy and a "Livestream Experience" scheduled for May 21, 2021. The lead single "Shy Away" premiered on BBC Radio 1 on April 7, with a music video being released shortly after alongside an official album announcement on the band's social media. A second single, "Choker", premiered on the band's livestream pre-access website, with fans participating in a release event. The music video and single were premiered on April 30, 2021, at 12:00am ET. The third single from the album, "Saturday", was released on May 18, 2021, with a music video for the song released on July 8, 2021. "The Outside" was released as the fourth and final single on November 24, 2021, followed by a music video on March 18, 2022.

=== Livestream event ===
The duo was initially reluctant to do a livestream concert, arguing that "you can't recreate a live experience on a stream". However, they changed their minds as they resolved to "create something that's never been done before", and promised in an interview with NME that "it's not going to be stale by song two, like every other livestream concert." Their manager, Chris Woltman, stressed that it would be different from their past live shows, describing it as "a convergence of live theater mixed with a livestream moment and a Twenty One Pilots show". Work on the event began in July 2020, and required 150 production and support staff, 12 cameras, almost 30,000 square feet of on-set floor space, over 130 rehearsal hours, and 13 days for its setup, rehearsal and the show itself, according to the band's management team. The show took place at Value City Arena in Columbus, Ohio, and its synopsis is tied to the storyline in Trench, featuring numerous Easter eggs concerning the band's lore. The livestream's webpage received 3.6 million sessions from April 7, which included 3.48 million hours of watch time from 202 international territories on a million unique devices, 56% of them from outside the United States. The event garnered acclaim from various publications, including NME, who awarded it five stars, with Ali Shutler calling it "one of the most forward-thinking shows that've been attempted in over a year" which "sees them push the limit on just what a livestream can be". Gil Kaufman of Billboard described it as "eye-popping" and a "Las Vegas-worthy spectacle".

On April 8, 2022, the duo announced a limited theatrical release of the livestream concert, which was set for May 19, 2022. According to The Numbers, it earned approximately $1,560,000 worldwide.

== Critical reception ==
Professional ratings
Aggregate scores
Source	Rating
AnyDecentMusic?	6.0/10
Metacritic	70/100
Review scores
Source	Rating
AllMusic	4/5 stars
The Arts Desk	4/5 stars
Clash	7/10
Evening Standard	3/5 stars
Financial Times	2/5 stars
Gigwise	5/10 stars
The Guardian	3/5 stars
Kerrang!	3/5
The Line of Best Fit	7/10
NME	4/5 stars

According to the review aggregator Metacritic, Scaled and Icy received "generally favorable reviews" based on a weighted average score of 70 out of 100 from 9 critic scores.

Ali Shutler of NME praised the album as "an expectation-crushing statement of ambition", noting its more optimistic and upbeat tone compared to the band's earlier work while still remaining "very much in the Twenty One Pilots universe". The Guardian's Rachel Aroesti also noted the "move away from this anxious melancholy"; she claimed that while fans would "view this shift as hard-won hopefulness", listeners unfamiliar with the band would find the album "pleasingly buoyant, if conspicuously USP-less". Jake Richardson of Kerrang! considered that although "there are times on Scaled And Icy where things just feel a little safe", it "is a good record which balances out the occasional underwhelming moment with flashes of brilliance that could only come from its creators".

Steven Loftin of The Line of Best Fit commended the album's fun sound and the progression it represented for the band, concluding that "while it's not a home run, as a society it's a time for exploration and change, and the duo have pasted the pastel colours on heavy ready for when the sunshine decides to grace us with its presence". Writing for Stereogum, Chris DeVille opined that the album "maintains the knack for poppy off-kilter rock music that made the band stars in the first place" aside from "a few clunkers", and considered that it represented an evolution towards a more grown-up sound and image. Clash's meanwhile asserted that "most – though not all of these tracks having you reaching for the replay button", and added that "memorable is definitely the word to describe the album". However, Mason Meyers of Gigwise called the album "an unfocused, often forgettable, attempt to appeal to the masses with cutesy pop tunes".

Several reviews criticized the loose relationship between the album's content and the surrounding concept. Ludovic Hunter-Tilney was critical of the record's "contradictory tones" in his assessment for the Financial Times, arguing that "tracks are caught between servicing the concept and existing in their own right", and concluded that "the result suggests indecision, not an enigmatic layer of mystery". David Smyth of the Evening Standard also highlighted the contrast between the "bright and poppy" sound of the album and its conceptual promotion, asking: "Is it worth sticking around to hunt for secret messages though? Not really." Conversely, AllMusic's Neil Z. Yeung wrote that "whether or not they decide to revive their ongoing album mythology, Scaled and Icy will remain a quick dose of TOP perfection, a lean catalog gem that is bright, effervescent, and immensely addictive."

=== Accolades ===
The album won Top Rock Album at the 2022 Billboard Music Awards, beating out OK Orchestra by AJR, Music of the Spheres by Coldplay, Mercury – Act 1 by Imagine Dragons, and Sob Rock by John Mayer.

== Track listing ==
All tracks are written by Tyler Joseph. All tracks are produced by Joseph, except where noted.

Scaled and Icy track listing
No.	Title	Producer(s)	Length
1.	"Good Day"	Mike Elizondo; Joseph	3:24
2.	"Choker"		3:43
3.	"Shy Away"		2:55
4.	"The Outside"		3:36
5.	"Saturday"	Greg Kurstin; Joseph; Meany	2:52
6.	"Never Take It"		3:32
7.	"Mulberry Street"	Elizondo; Joseph	3:44
8.	"Formidable"		2:56
9.	"Bounce Man"		3:05
10.	"No Chances"		3:46
11.	"Redecorate"	Joseph; Meany	4:05
Total length:			37:42

Livestream version
No.	Title	Producer(s)	Length
12.	"Choker / Stressed Out / Migraine / Morph / Holding On to You" (Livestream version)	Joseph; Elizondo; Meany	9:40
13.	"Mulberry Street" (Livestream version)	Joseph; Elizondo	4:21
14.	"Lane Boy / Redecorate / Chlorine" (Livestream version)	Ricky Reed	6:02
15.	"Shy Away" (Livestream version)		2:56
16.	"The Outside" (Livestream version)		4:56
17.	"Heathens / Trees" (Livestream version)	Joseph; Elizondo	4:19
18.	"Jumpsuit / Heavydirtysoul" (Livestream version)		4:08
19.	"Saturday / Level of Concern / Ride / Car Radio" (Livestream version)	Joseph; Kurstin; Meany	12:50
20.	"Never Take It" (Livestream version)		3:38
21.	"Level of Concern"	Joseph; Meany	3:40
Total length:			94:00

Notes

- ^{^[a]} indicates an additional producer

== Personnel ==
Credits adapted from the album's liner notes.

Twenty One Pilots

- Tyler Joseph – lead vocals, programming, guitars, bass, piano, keyboards, organs, ukulele, songwriting, executive production
- Josh Dun – drums (all tracks), percussion, trumpet, drum engineering (2, 3, 6, 8), backing vocals

Additional musicians

- Mike Elizondo – bass (1, 7)
- Paul Meany – production (5, 11)
- Greg Kurstin – production (5)
- Brittany Haas – violin (1)
- Steven Patrick – trumpet (1, 7)
- Matt Pauling – violin (2)
- Jay Joseph – group vocals (6, 9, 10)
- Payton Byrd – group vocals (6, 9, 10)
- J. R. Bowers – group vocals (6, 9, 10)
- Christopher Matis – group vocals (6, 9, 10)
- Kyle Schmidt – group vocals (6, 9, 10)
- Jack Peterman – group vocals (6, 9, 10)

Technical

- Adam Hawkins – mixing
- Chris Gehringer – mastering
- Lawson White – engineering (1, 7)
- Matt Pauling – drum engineering (2, 6)
- T. J. Bechill – group vocal engineering (6, 9, 10)
- Erica Block – engineering assistance (1, 7)
- Zachary Stokes – engineering assistance (1, 7)
- Chris Woltman – executive production

Design

- Mark Eshleman – creative director (video)
- Brandon Rike – creative director (design)
- Ashley Osborn – photographic and illustration

== Charts ==
=== Weekly charts ===
Chart performance for Scaled and Icy
Chart (2021)	Peak position
Argentine Albums (CAPIF)	10
Australian Albums (ARIA)	3
Austrian Albums (Ö3 Austria)	4
Belgian Albums (Ultratop Flanders)	7
Belgian Albums (Ultratop Wallonia)	4
Canadian Albums (Billboard)	5
Czech Albums (ČNS IFPI)	2
Danish Albums (Hitlisten)	35
Dutch Albums (Album Top 100)	7
Finnish Albums (Suomen virallinen lista)	11
French Albums (SNEP)	6
German Albums (Offizielle Top 100)	6
Hungarian Albums (MAHASZ)	4
Icelandic Albums (Tónlistinn)	27
Irish Albums (Official Charts)	5
Italian Albums (FIMI)	15
Japanese Albums (Oricon)	136
Lithuanian Albums (AGATA)	9
New Zealand Albums (RMNZ)	3
Norwegian Albums (VG-lista)	23
Polish Albums (ZPAV)	9
Portuguese Albums (AFP)	4
Scottish Albums (Official Charts)	4
Slovak Albums (ČNS IFPI)	5
Spanish Albums (Promusicae)	9
Swedish Albums (Sverigetopplistan)	24
Swiss Albums (Schweizer Hitparade)	4
UK Albums (Official Charts)	3
Uruguayan Albums (CUD)	9
US Billboard 200	3
US Top Alternative Albums (Billboard)	1
US Top Rock Albums (Billboard)	1

=== Year-end charts ===
2021 year-end chart performance for Scaled and Icy
Chart (2021)	Position
Hungarian Albums (MAHASZ)	79
US Top Alternative Albums (Billboard)	26
US Top Rock Albums (Billboard)	47

== Certifications ==
Certifications for Scaled and Icy
Region	Certification	Certified units/sales
Brazil (Pro-Música Brasil)	Gold	20,000^{‡}
Canada (Music Canada)	Gold	40,000^{‡}
Netherlands (NVPI)	Platinum	37,200^{‡}
United Kingdom (BPI)	Silver	60,000^{‡}
United States (RIAA)	Gold	500,000^{‡}
^{‡} Sales+streaming figures based on certification alone.
