= Peter McPoland =

American singer, songwriter and musician

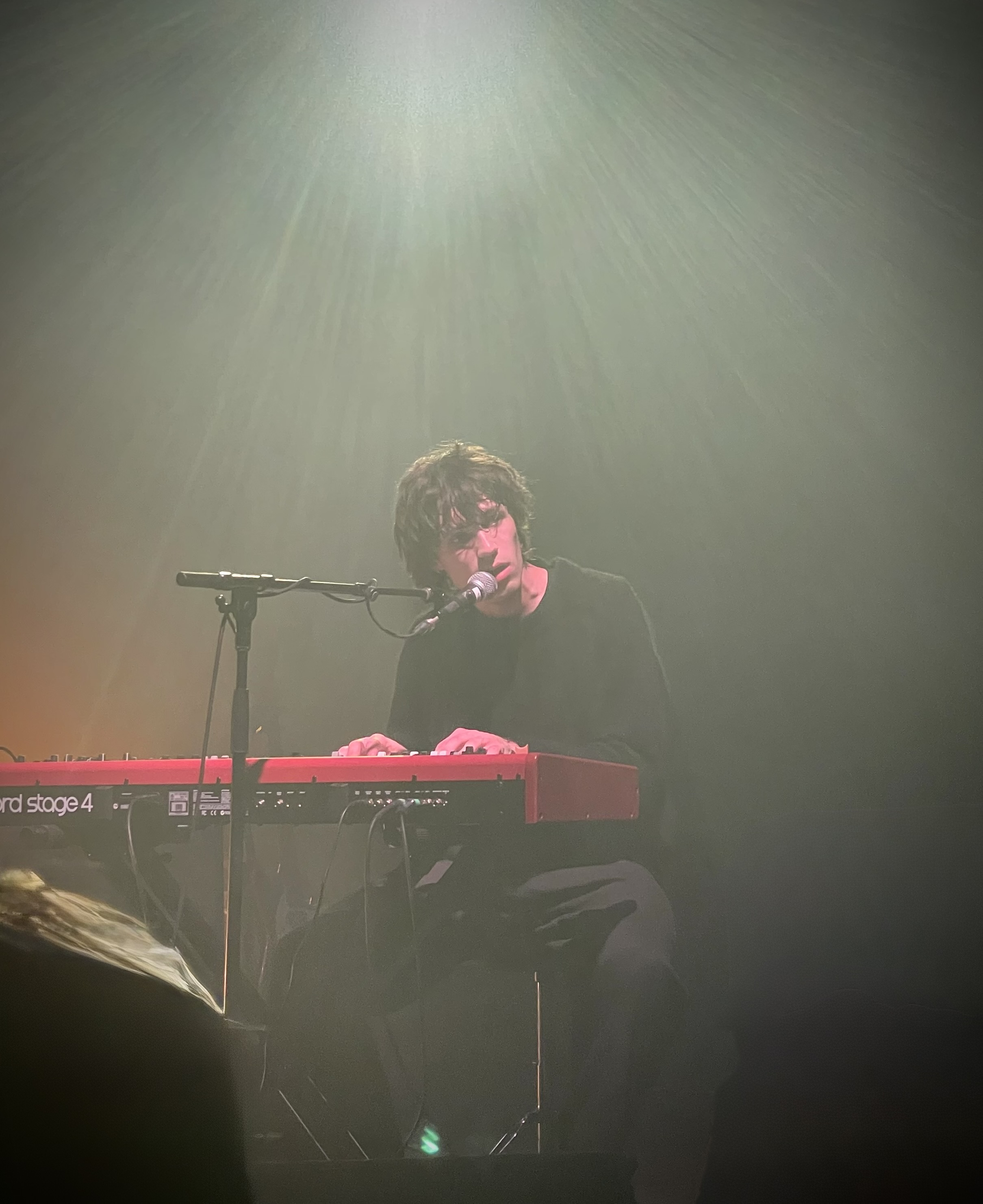
- McPoland performing in 2026

Background information
- Born: November 3, 2000 (age 25); Burlington, Vermont, US
- Genres: Alternative rock; Indie rock
- Occupations: Singer; musician; songwriter
- Labels: Columbia; West End; Stem
- Website: www.petermcpoland.com

Peter Francis McPoland (born November 3, 2000) is an American singer-songwriter and musician. In 2021, McPoland signed with Columbia Records. On August 11, 2023, McPoland released his debut album, Piggy.

== Biography ==
Peter Francis McPoland was born on November 3, 2000, in Burlington, Vermont. He moved to Texas when he was seven years old. After picking up the guitar at age 14, he taught himself how to play the instrument. Growing up, he was exposed to music from an early age, especially country and folk music. In a 2019 interview, he stated, "both of my parents are very into music, and my father — a lot of my influences come from my father." He has also stated that his major influences include, John Prine, Bruce Springsteen, Gregory Alan Isakov, and Dire Straits. When McPoland was younger, he planned to be a folk singer, even asking for a banjo for Christmas, but his parents got him an electric guitar instead. After turning nine years old, McPoland became involved in various musical theatre productions, which is where he stated that passion for music started. McPoland was in a relationship with influencer Emma Chamberlain from May 2024 to November 2025.

== Career ==
=== 2018-2022: Early Singles and Slow Down ===
Throughout 2018–2020, McPoland released his first singles "Lady Bird", "Sally Forth", and "I Love You Too".

In 2020, McPoland released his song "Romeo and Juliet", but it was not until March 2021, when he posted an acoustic version of the song on his TikTok, that the video gathered over a million views. The song, along with the video, helped him start his career, and subsequently, in May of the same year, he signed to Columbia Records. After signing, he continued to release singles such as "Shit Show", "Eloise", "i can't sleep", and more. Beginning in 2022, McPoland began releasing singles including "Dead Air," "News at 9," "Let Her Remember," and "String Lights," which were eventually included in the release of his first 7-track EP, Slow Down, on May 13, 2022. Throughout August and September 2022, McPoland served as the opening act for Twenty One Pilots on their Icy Tour.

=== 2023: Piggy ===
On April 7, 2023, McPoland released a single, "Digital Silence", and announced an upcoming debut album. This was followed by the release of a single titled "Blue" on May 5, 2023. A third single, "Turn off the Noise", was released on June 2, 2023, along with the announcement that his album would be released on August 11, 2023, and would be titled Piggy. McPoland stated that the album title references a main character in the novel Lord of the Flies, and that it was inspired by his emotions regarding his parents' divorce. On July 7, 2023, a fourth single, "Ceiling Fan/Piggy", was released.

==== 2024: Friend ====
McPoland released a seven-track extended play, titled Friend, on December 6, 2024 via Columbia. A review in Ones to Watch noted the record's "bright and clean sound" and said it was full of "raw emotion and evocative lyrics." In 2024, McPoland headlined two separate tours and also opened for Imagine Dragons on some dates of their Loom World Tour.

=== 2025: Big Lucky ===
McPoland's second album, Big Lucky, came out on September 26, 2025. The album was released through his own imprint West End Productions and distributed via Stem. It's his first independent album after he left Columbia Records. McPoland produced, engineered and performed every part of the album. He used a tape machine to record it. The album features 16 tracks. McPoland himself painted its cover.

The record's name refers to a four-leaf clover McPoland has had since he was 18.

== Discography ==
=== Albums ===
List of studio albums
Title	Details
Piggy	Released: August 11, 2023; Label: Columbia Records; Format: Digital download, streaming
Big Lucky	Released: September 26, 2025; Label: West End, Stem; Format: Digital download, streaming, vinyl

=== Extended plays ===
List of extended plays
Title	Details
Slow Down	Released: May 13, 2022; Label: Columbia Records; Format: Digital download, streaming
Piglet Live	Released: December 15, 2023; Label: Columbia Records; Format: Digital download, streaming
Friend	Released: December 6, 2024; Label: Columbia Records; Format: Digital download, streaming

=== Singles ===
List of singles, with selected chart positions
Title	Year	Peak chart positions	Album
Title	Year	NZ Hot	Album
"Lady Bird"	2018	—	Non-album singles
"Sally Forth" (feat. Mason Ashley)	2019	—	Non-album singles
"I Love You Too"	2020	—	Non-album singles
"Romeo & Juliet"	2020	—	Non-album singles
"Eloise"	2021	—	Non-album singles
"(Here's to the) Prom Queen"	2021	—	Non-album singles
"Romeo & Juliet" (acoustic)	2021	—	Non-album singles
"I Can't Sleep"	2021	—	Non-album singles
"Happy Birthday Babe"	2021	—	Non-album singles
"Shit Show"	2021	—	Non-album singles
"Tonight"	2022	—	Non-album singles
"Digital Silence"	2023	29	Piggy
"Blue"	2023	—	Piggy
"Turn Off The Noise"	2023	—	Piggy
"Ceiling Fan/Piggy"	2023		Piggy

== Tours ==
=== Headlining ===
- Peter McPoland Fall Tour (2021)
- The Slow Down Tour (2022)
- Piggy Tour (2023)
- The Midwest Sound Tour (2024)
- Buddy Tour (2024)
- The Big Lucky Tour (2025-2026)

=== Opening act ===
- The Icy Tour for Twenty One Pilots (2022)
- Loom World Tour for Imagine Dragons (2024)
