= Twenty One Pilots =

American musical duo

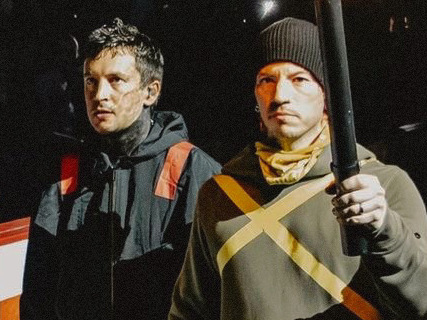
- Joseph and Dun in Dublin during The Clancy World Tour in 2025

Background information
- Origin: Columbus, Ohio, U.S.
- Genres: Alternative rock; electropop; alternative hip-hop; pop rap; indie pop; pop rock
- Works: Discography; songs
- Years active: 2009–present
- Labels: Fueled by Ramen; Elektra; Atlantic
- Awards: Full list
- Members: Tyler Joseph; Josh Dun
- Past members: Chris Salih; Nick Thomas
- Website: twentyonepilots.com

Twenty One Pilots (Note: Stylized in all lowercase as twenty one pilots, twenty øne piløts or twenty | one | pilots, and abbreviated similarly (tøp or TØP)) is an American musical duo from Columbus, Ohio, consisting of frontman Tyler Joseph and drummer Josh Dun. The band is known for its difficult-to-categorize mix of musical styles, lyrics concerning personal insecurities, and energetic live shows featuring costumes and on-stage acrobatics. They are also known for their dedicated fanbase and an alternate universe storyline told through several concept albums.

The band was formed in 2009 by Joseph, bassist Nick Thomas, and drummer Chris Salih. After independently releasing their first album, Twenty One Pilots (2009), Salih was replaced by Dun in May 2011 and Thomas left the following month, with the group continuing as a duo. Following their second independent album, Regional at Best (2011), the duo was signed by record label Fueled by Ramen in 2012. Their label debut, Vessel (2013), became the second album in history on which every track received at least a gold certification.

The duo achieved breakthrough success in 2015 with their fourth album, Blurryface, which produced the hit singles "Stressed Out" and "Ride" and became the first album on which every track received at least a gold certification from the Recording Industry Association of America. "Stressed Out" earned Twenty One Pilots a Grammy Award for Best Pop Duo/Group Performance at the 59th Annual Grammy Awards. The release of "Heathens" in 2016 also made the group the first alternative artist in history to have two concurrent top five singles in the Billboard Hot 100 and the third rock act in history to have two singles simultaneously chart in the top five of the Billboard Hot 100, joining the Beatles and Elvis Presley. A few more of the band’s singles had moderate Hot 100 success since then, including “Jumpsuit” (2018), “Level of Concern” (2020) and “Drag Path” (2026), but none have reached the same level as their 2016 hits.

The duo has released four more studio albums: Trench (2018), Scaled and Icy (2021), Clancy (2024), and Breach (2025). Breach became the duo’s first album to reach number-one on the Billboard 200 since Blurryface a decade earlier. They have garnered 14 number-one songs on the Alternative Airplay chart, tying with Linkin Park and Cage the Elephant for the second-most.

== History ==
=== 2009–2011: Formation and self-titled album ===
Tyler Joseph first met future bandmate Nick Thomas at a young age while playing youth basketball in Columbus, Ohio. Thomas later transferred to Joseph's middle school, and the two would remain friends throughout high school.

Joseph began playing music after finding an old keyboard inside his closet, a Christmas gift he received from his mother, and began mimicking radio melodies. In 2007, Joseph released a solo EP, No Phun Intended, in his parents' basement. Thomas contributed guitar to several songs on the album, and collaborated with Joseph on the track "Trees".

While attending Ohio State University, Joseph met Texas-born future bandmate Chris Salih at a party. Noting the songwriter's talent and creative energy, Salih consulted Joseph about starting a band. Impressed by the recording studio Salih had built in his house, Joseph agreed to play music together and began sharing his ideas for new music. Just before their first performance, Joseph invited Thomas to join the unnamed band as a bassist. In 2009, the group moved into a house of their own, where their first album was conceptualized and recorded in the basement.

The band initially played for a wide variety of audiences at clubs and venues around the Columbus area. Playing at metal, hardcore, and electronic venues influenced Joseph to incorporate these disparate styles into his songwriting. To catch the attention of unfamiliar or uninterested attendees and promoters, the band began to experiment with costumes and on-stage acrobatics.

Now going by the name Twenty One Pilots, the group released their debut album, Twenty One Pilots, on December 29, 2009, and began touring Ohio. Their initial marketing was grassroots; Joseph's mother would stand outside of Ohio State University, giving away tickets to their shows. During this time, the band participated in various "Battle of the Band" contests at The Alrosa Villa and The Basement, important Columbus music venues.

In 2010, the band posted two tracks to their SoundCloud account, a cover of "Jar of Hearts" by Christina Perri and "Time to Say Goodbye", an original song that samples "Con te partirò" by Andrea Bocelli and Sarah Brightman. The latter track would become the first song that local drummer Josh Dun heard from the group.

Joseph, Dun, and Salih participated in the musical efforts of the Columbus church Five14. They contributed to four of fourteen tracks for their album Clear, with Travis Whittaker and the gospel rock band New Albany Music. In 2011, Joseph appeared in a three-part video called "The (Moderately Inspiring Tale of the) Longboard Rodeo Tango", and sang "O Come, O Come, Emmanuel" in another video, "Christmas with the Stars".

=== 2011–2012: Lineup changes and Regional at Best ===
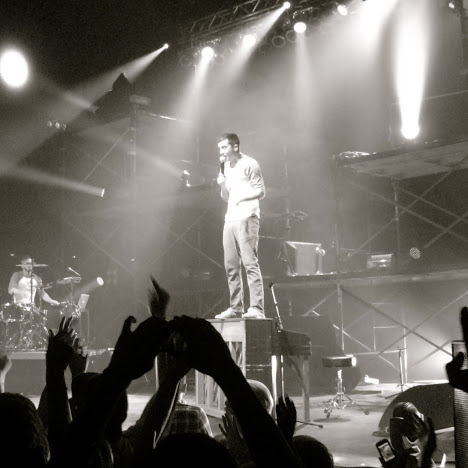
Twenty One Pilots performing in 2012

Salih left the band on May 8, 2011, to focus on work, and Thomas left the following month on June 3 to focus on schooling, both posting farewell notes on the band's official Facebook page. Before departing from the project, Salih invited Guitar Center co-worker and friend of the group Josh Dun (former touring drummer for House of Heroes), to take his place in the band. Impressed by the band's potential and Joseph's creative vision, Dun abandoned plans to pursue drumming in Nashville and joined the project only a few weeks before Thomas left the group.

Both Salih and Thomas remained involved with the band's production for some time after their departure. Thomas briefly attended school in North Carolina, but moved back into Joseph and Dun's house in Columbus a year later and began to manage their merchandise. Thomas remained a part of the merchandise distribution crew throughout the production of Blurryface and continues to stay actively involved in the band's tour cycle.

With a new lineup consisting of only Joseph and Dun, Twenty One Pilots self-released their second album, Regional at Best, on July 8, 2011. The album was accompanied by a free CD release show on the grounds of New Albany High School. While Salih and Thomas were involved with the conceptualization of the album, neither they nor Dun claim to have had much involvement with its production, which was handled nearly exclusively by Joseph. The album features Joseph's brother Zack on the track "Kitchen Sink" and Joseph's college acquaintance Jocef on the track "Be Concerned".

In November 2011, after months of cultivating a fan base in the Columbus area via social media interaction and constant touring, the band played a sold-out concert at Columbus' Newport Music Hall. This caught the attention of several record labels interested in seeing if the band's appeal could stretch outside of Ohio. That same year, the duo put out two free songs via their email newsletter: the original version of "House of Gold" and "Two".

Joseph and Dun embarked on the Regional at Best Tour with rock band Challenger!, documenting it in a series of videos uploaded to the Twenty One Pilots YouTube channel.

=== 2012–2014: Major-label signing and Vessel ===
In April 2012, the band announced their signing to Atlantic Records subsidiary Fueled by Ramen during a show at the Lifestyle Communities Pavilion. On July 17, 2012, they released their debut Fueled by Ramen recording, an EP entitled Three Songs. The next month, the band embarked on a short tour with Neon Trees and Walk the Moon.

Joseph, in a 2023 livestream reflecting on the lead-up to what would become Vessel, talked about signing with Fueled by Ramen and Regional at Best: "it was just a record that we had on the merch table when we were performing independently, and then we wanted to go record a real, professional record when we got signed – some of those songs we took from Regional at Best and kind of re-recorded them, and some of we had written new, since then. And that's what Vessel is. I know some people might not like this, but I kind of view Vessel as our first record." Regional at Best tracks "Slowtown", "Anathema", "Ruby", "Be Concerned", and "Clear" have since been made commercially unavailable.

On November 12, 2012, the music video for "Holding On to You", directed by Jordan Bahat, was released on YouTube. On January 7 and April 19, 2013, the band released music videos for "Guns for Hands" and "Car Radio", respectively, both directed by Mark Eshleman of Reel Bear Media.

In an interview with the Huffington Post, Joseph described Regional at Best as a "glorified mixtape" and confirmed that songs from that project would reappear on their major-label debut album. Ultimately, five tracks from Regional at Best – "Guns for Hands", "Holding On to You", "Ode to Sleep", "Car Radio", and "Trees" – were re-recorded and released for their third album. "Lovely" was also re-recorded and released as a single in Japan on April 17, 2013. "Glowing Eyes", "Kitchen Sink", and "Forest" appeared unchanged as bonus tracks on the UK version of Vessel.

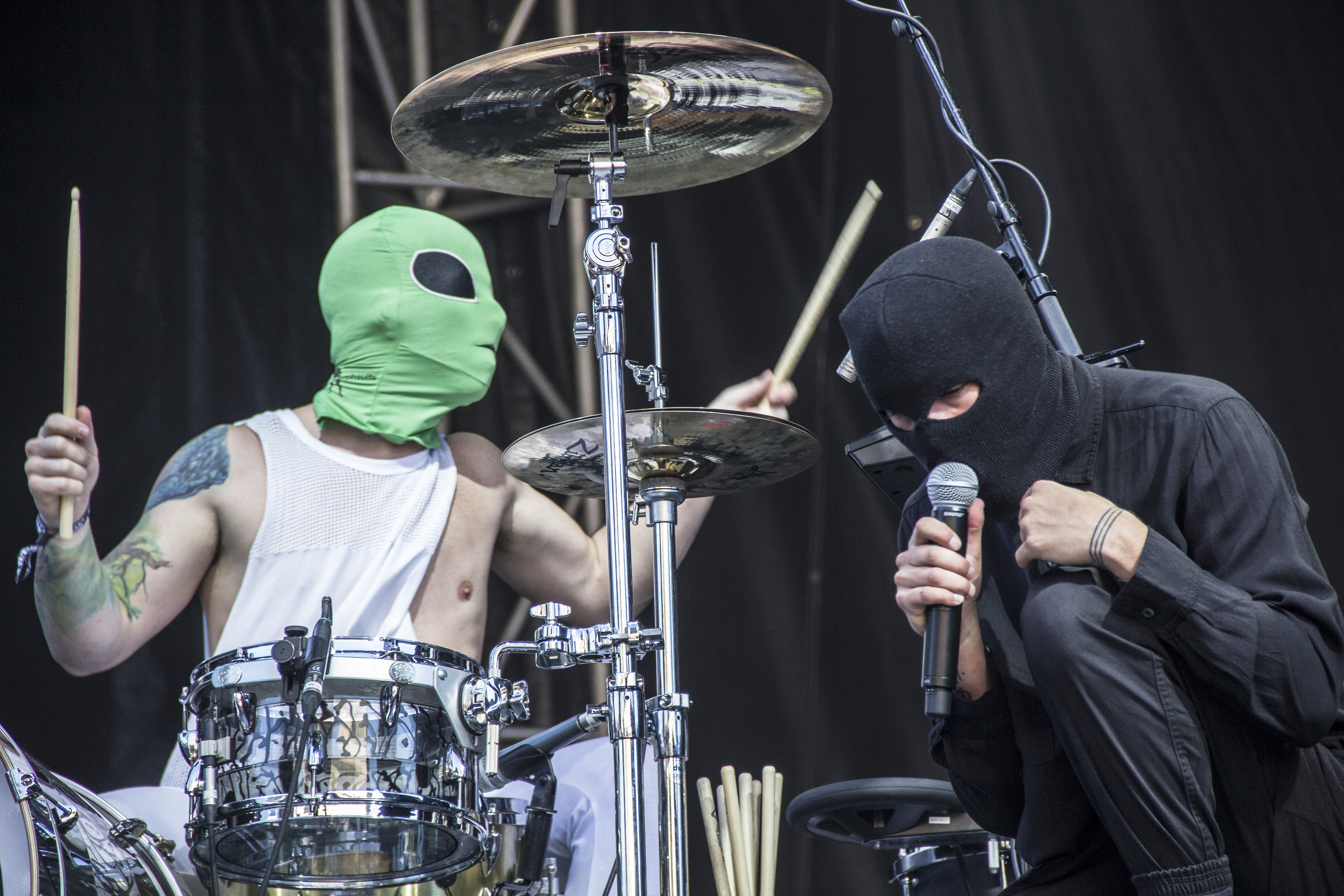
Twenty One Pilots performing live in 2014 for "Boston Calling: Day Three"

Vessel was released on January 8, 2013, and later reached No. 21 on the Billboard 200, No. 9 on the Digital Albums chart, No. 17 on the Internet Albums chart, No. 15 on the Rock Albums Chart, and No. 10 on the Alternative Albums Chart. The band's first charting single, "Holding On to You", reached No. 10 on the Billboard US Rock Airplay chart. Additionally, "Guns for Hands" and "Lovely" reached No. 21 and No. 67, respectively, on the Japan Hot 100. In 2019, Vessel became the second album in history to have every track receive at least a gold certification, making Twenty One Pilots the first and only band to see every song on two albums earn gold or platinum awards.

In 2013, Twenty One Pilots (along with Panic! at the Disco) were one of the opening acts for Fall Out Boy on their Save Rock and Roll Arena Tour. On August 8, 2013, Twenty One Pilots performed "House of Gold" on Conan in their late night debut. On October 2, the music video for the song was uploaded onto YouTube.

On March 17, 2014, Twenty One Pilots performed a set at the MTVU Woodie Awards during SXSW. On April 13, Twenty One Pilots performed "Car Radio" at the 2014 MTV Movie Awards. On April 28, the band performed "Car Radio" on Late Night with Seth Meyers.

In 2014, Twenty One Pilots played a number of music festivals and other events around the United States, such as Lollapalooza, Bonnaroo, Boston Calling, and Firefly. Requests from many of these cities were incorporated into the band's first headlining tour, the Quiet Is Violent World Tour, which began in September 2014 and ended in November of the same year.

On December 31, 2014, the band released a music video for "Ode to Sleep". Composed of footage captured by the band's creative director Mark Eshleman from three concerts over the preceding three years, the video depicted the band's growth from their origins as a small local band to a nationally popular alternative act.

=== 2015–2017: Blurryface and commercial success ===
On March 16, 2015, the band announced that a new album, Blurryface, was to be released on May 19. They released the first single, "Fairly Local", on March 17. Their second single of the album, "Tear in My Heart", and its music video were released on April 5, 2015. On April 28, "Stressed Out", the third song released from the album, was released along with a music video. "Stressed Out" became the group's best-selling single, having been certified 13× Platinum, and peaking at No. 2 on the U.S. Billboard Hot 100, and No. 1 on both the Alternative Songs and Hot Rock Songs charts, while also surpassing over 3 billion views on YouTube.

Blurryface was released two days early on May 17, 2015, and sold 134,000 copies in the first week in the U.S. which made it the band's first No. 1 album on the Billboard 200. On May 22, 2016, Blurryface won in the category of "Top Rock Album" at the Billboard Music Awards, while the band won the category of "Top Rock Artist". Blurryface became the first album on which every track received at least a gold certification from the Recording Industry Association of America.

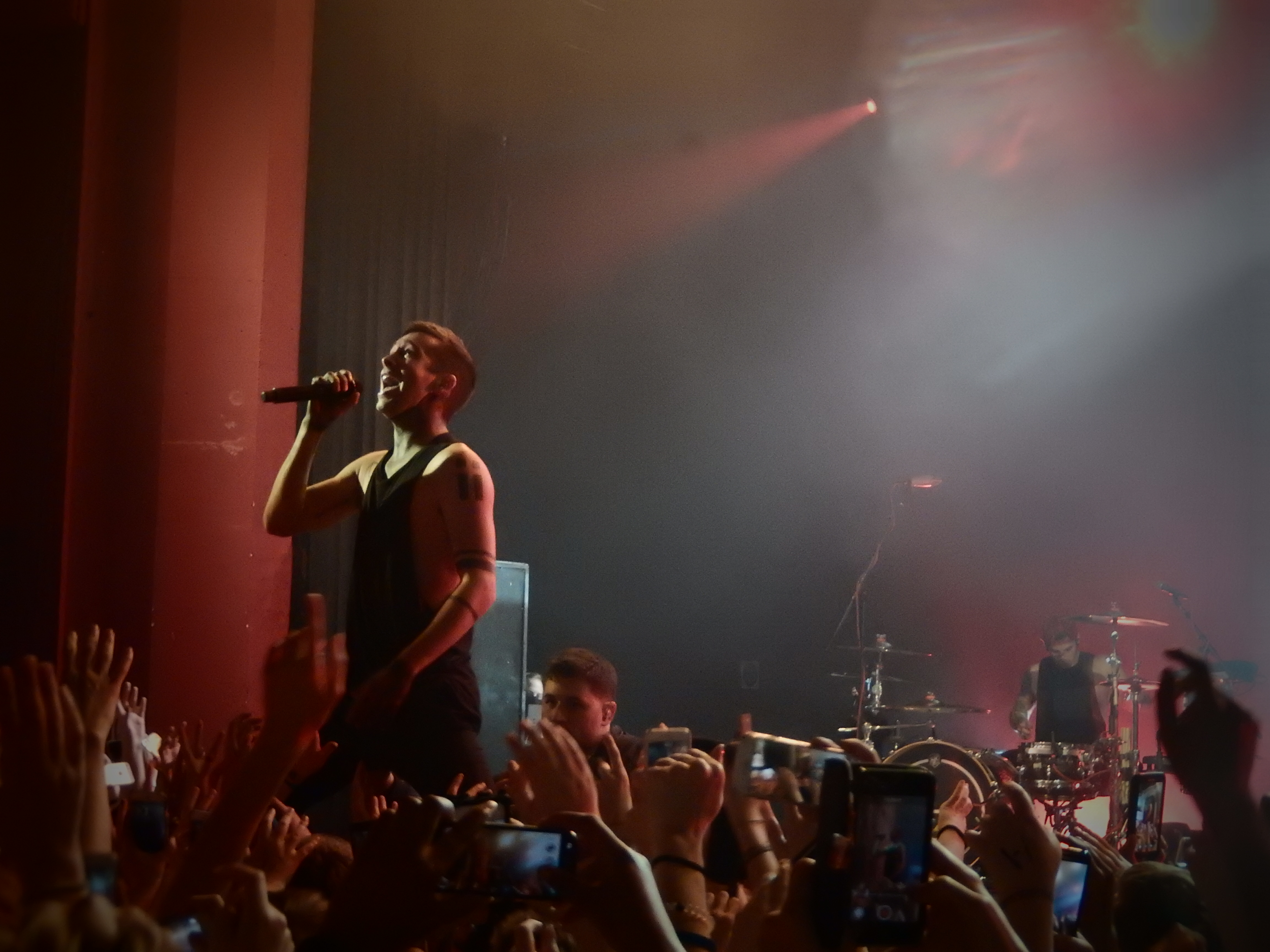
Twenty One Pilots performing at Shepherd's Bush Empire in late 2015

The band began the Blurryface Tour on May 11, 2015, in Glasgow, Scotland. Their headline route spanned the United States, England, and Canada. The U.S. leg featured Echosmith and Finish Ticket as openers. Twenty One Pilots performed "Stressed Out" on Late Night with Seth Meyers on September 14, 2015. The band announced a London show in February 2016, and later announced a run of UK dates, with a second London date added. The band Transviolet served as openers.

A second tour for the Blurryface album, the Emotional Roadshow World Tour, started in Cincinnati on May 31, 2016. The tour covered the United States, Canada, Mexico, Europe, and Australia. Chef'Special and Mutemath opened for the American leg. Irish singer Bry joined the tour for its European leg.

On June 16, 2016, the band released the song "Heathens" as the first single from the Suicide Squad soundtrack, earlier than the expected release date of June 24, after the song leaked onto the internet on June 15. A music video for the song was released on June 21, 2016. "Heathens" plays during the ending credits of the film. The track became their second No. 2 song on the U.S. Billboard Hot 100, and second to become certified Diamond. The fifth single from Blurryface, "Ride," peaked at No. 5 on the charts and earned their third Diamond certification. Alongside "Heathens," which reached No. 4 the same week, the band became the third rock act in the 58-year history of the Hot 100 to have two singles simultaneously in the top five, joining the ranks of the Beatles and Elvis Presley, making them the first act in 47 years to achieve this milestone.

In September 2016, the band contributed a cover of the piano ballad "Cancer" by My Chemical Romance to the tribute album Rock Sound Presents: The Black Parade. An animated lyric video followed the release of the song.

Twenty One Pilots featured as the musical guest on Saturday Night Live on October 8, 2016, performing orchestra-accompanied versions of "Heathens" and "Ride". The band later performed a medley of "Heathens" and "Stressed Out" on the American Music Awards of 2016, where they also accepted their first awards on American television for Favorite Pop/Rock Duo and Favorite Alternative Rock Artist. On November 25, 2016, the band released a limited-edition live vinyl album documenting two performances at Fox Oakland Theatre, on the duo's 2015 Blurryface Tour under the name Blurryface Live.

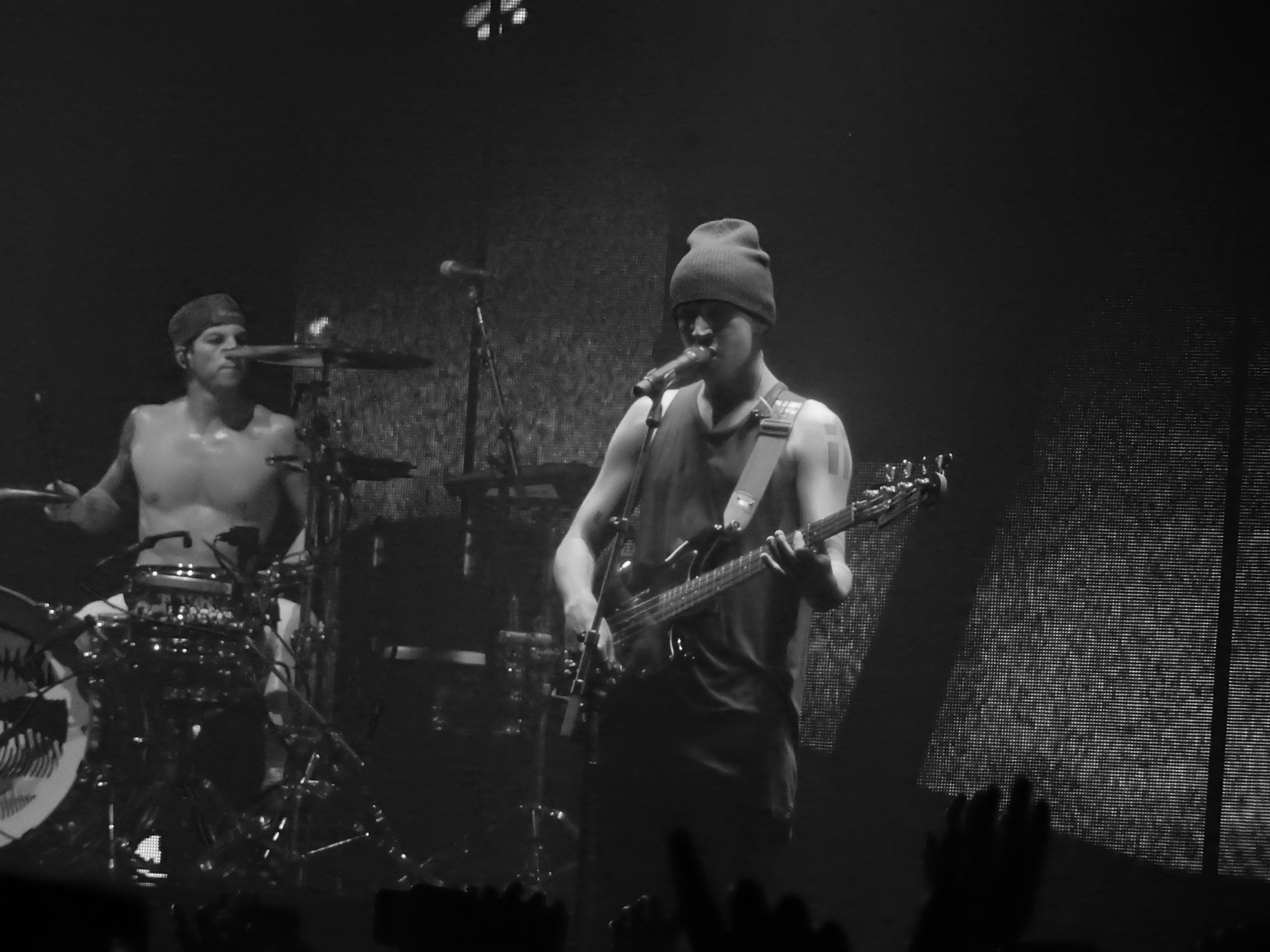
Twenty One Pilots performing in London in 2016

Joseph and Dun collaborated with Mutemath again for a five-song EP, TOPxMM, composed of remixes and re-imaginings of four tracks from Blurryface as well as "Heathens". The EP was uploaded onto the band's official website free of charge on December 19; a 25-minute long video of the bands recording the songs live in studio was also released on the band's YouTube channel.

On February 12, 2017, Twenty One Pilots won a Grammy Award for "Stressed Out" in the Best Pop Duo/Group Performance category. The band stripped to their underwear before taking the stage, with Joseph claiming in their acceptance speech that this was a fulfillment of a promise the duo had made to each other in their early days as a local Columbus band.

On March 27, 2017, the band began selling tickets for Tour De Columbus, a five-date hometown tour taking place in June 2017. The duo performed at several small venues they first played as a local band including The Basement, Newport Music Hall, and Express Live!, before ending their tour cycle with arena shows at Nationwide Arena and Value City Arena.

In an interview with Alternative Press in November 2016, Twenty One Pilots stated that after their last show for Blurryface, they will be "going dark" to focus on new music. Joseph stated that he would like to focus on lyrical content of the music, and bring the music back to the "authenticity, lyrics, delivery, and fearlessness of songwriting" similar to that of their self-titled debut album. The band's last activity came in July 2017 in the form of posts on social media depicting an eye closing over lyrics from several of their songs.

In March 2018, their song "Hometown" received a gold certification from the RIAA, making Blurryface the first full-length album to have every track achieve at least gold certification.

=== 2018–2020: Trench ===
In April 2018, a cryptic message was uncovered on the band's web store, which revealed a website known as dmaorg.info. Fans began using clues and found other sections of this site, hinting at the possibility of the band's return. There were multiple images uploaded to the website, including letters from a character named "Clancy". In July 2018, Twenty One Pilots broke their year-long silence, first sending a cryptic email to fans and later posting a video to all social media platforms and updating their logo and branding. Tyler Joseph made his first media appearance in over a year for an interview with Zane Lowe of Apple Music 1 (formerly Beats 1) from his home studio in Columbus, Ohio, in which he spoke about the band's year-long hiatus, creating the new album, and battling against personal demons and insecurities.

On July 11, 2018, the band released two new songs, "Jumpsuit" and "Nico and the Niners", as well as the music video for "Jumpsuit". Later, on July 26, 2018, the music video for "Nico and the Niners" was released. The song "Levitate" was subsequently released as the album's third single along with a music video on August 8, 2018.

On August 20, 2018, at the MTV VMAs, a ten-second long snippet of the song "My Blood" was played at the end of a commercial promoting the album. On August 27, 2018, the band made "My Blood" available on streaming services as the album's fourth official single. The band released their fifth album, Trench, on October 5, 2018. On the same day, they released the music video for their single "My Blood". Trench debuted at No. 2 on the Billboard 200, and No. 1 on the Top Rock Albums and Alternative Albums charts. All fourteen tracks from the album charted in the top 25 of the Hot Rock Songs chart, where five tracks were in the top 10.

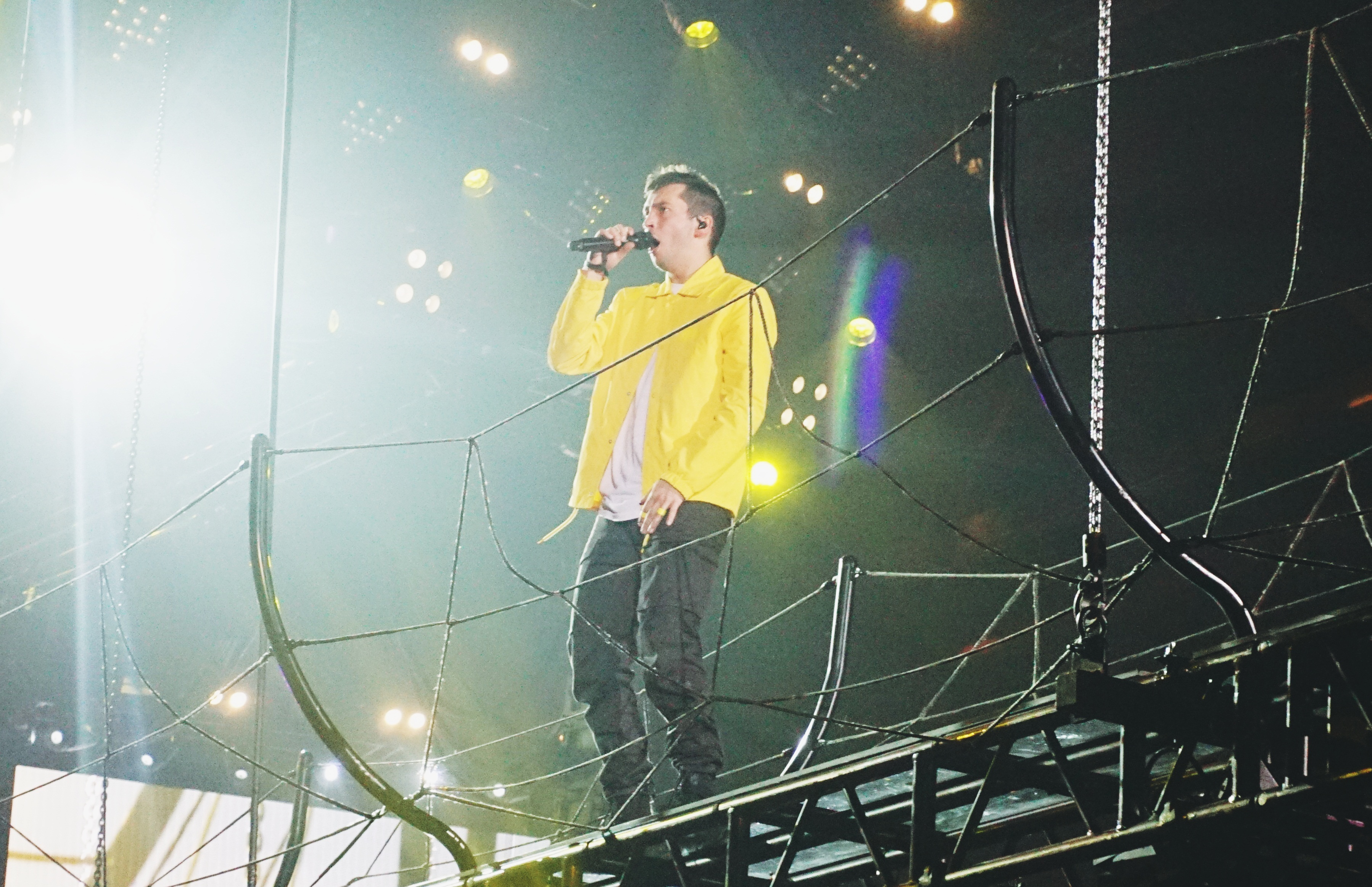
Tyler Joseph performing with Twenty One Pilots during The Bandito Tour in 2019

On September 12, 2018, Twenty One Pilots played their first live show in over a year, titled A Complete Diversion, at O2 Brixton Academy in London. They performed the four released songs from Trench, as well as some songs from their previous albums, to promote the album and the upcoming Bandito Tour. Twenty One Pilots performed their single "Jumpsuit" at the 2018 American Music Awards on October 9, at the Microsoft Theatre in Los Angeles. On November 1, the band performed stripped-down versions of "My Blood" and "Ride", as well as covering Damien Rice's "9 Crimes", in BBC Radio 1's Live Lounge. Radio 1 visited the band in their hometown and filmed the session at the Newport Music Hall in Columbus, Ohio, for the kickoff of the Live Lounge Month, a month-long series of performances from different artists.

On October 16, the band embarked on their worldwide Bandito Tour, starting in the U.S. and continuing with legs in Oceania and Europe. They also announced additional 2019 tour dates for shows in Canada, Mexico and the U.S. The band's stunts during the set included leaping, backflipping, vertical crowd-surfing, suspended bridge walking, and scaffolding scaling.

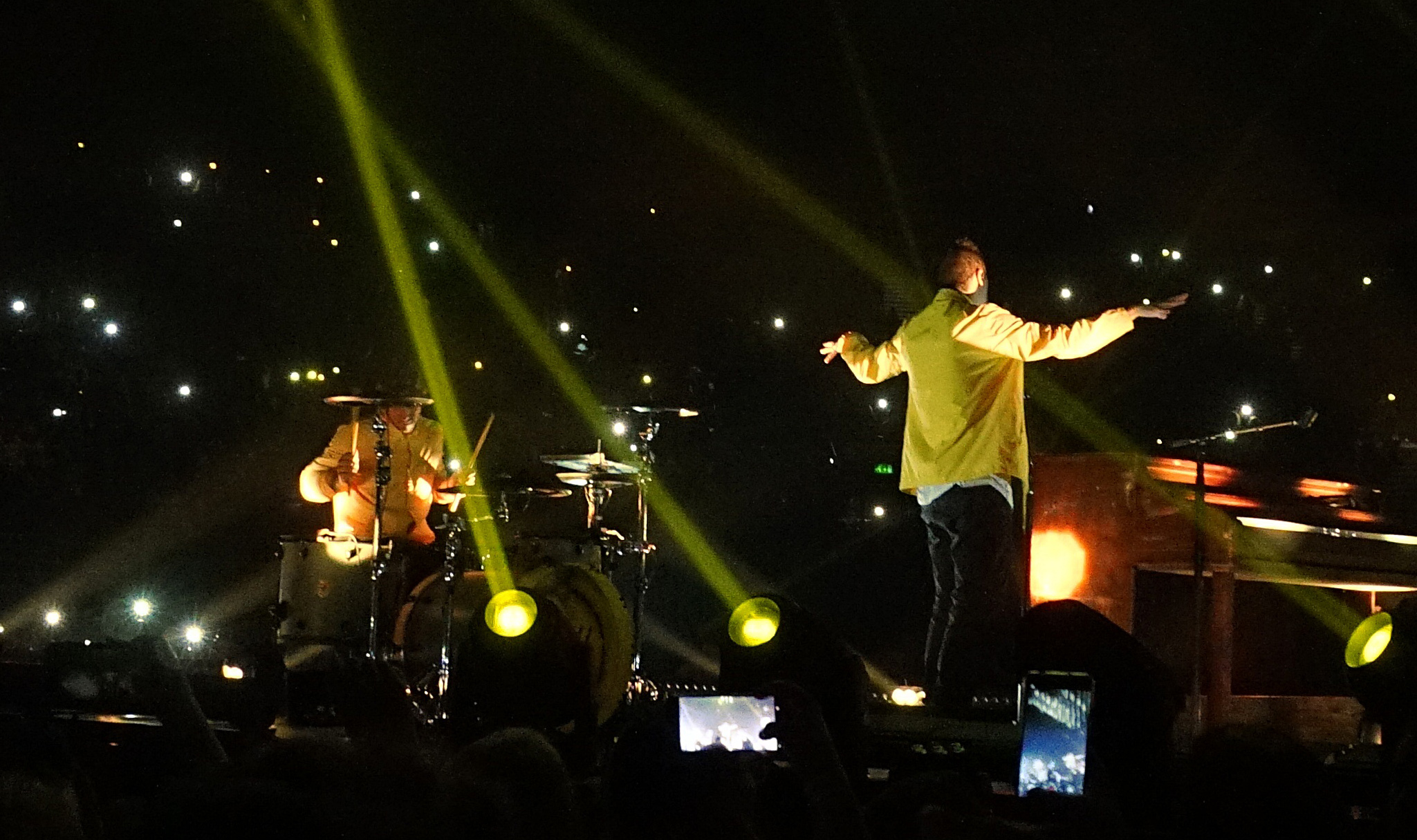
Twenty One Pilots performing at Resorts World Arena, Birmingham in 2019

On January 22, 2019, the music video for "Chlorine" was unveiled upon the song's release as a single and was directed by Mark Eshleman of Reel Bear Media, featuring an alien-like creature named "Ned". The band headlined a number of festivals in the summer of 2019, including Reading and Leeds and Lollapalooza.

On March 4, 2019, the band confirmed that they were working on their next studio album. About the possible theme, Joseph said, "there's a character that hasn't been talked about on any record yet that plays a huge role in the narrative that obviously will need to be talked about and it's probably where we're going next".

On June 19, 2019, a re-imagined version of "Chlorine", titled "Chlorine (19.4326° N, 99.1332° W)", was released. It was the first song to be released from the Location Sessions extended play. Other songs in the series include "Cut My Lip (Brooklyn)" and "The Hype (Berlin)". (Note: "Chlorine (19.4326° N, 99.1332° W)" was later retitled to "Chlorine (Mexico City)", and "Cut My Lip (Brooklyn)" was formally titled "Cut My Lip (40.6782°N, 73.9442° W)".) In 2019, Nationwide Boulevard in Columbus, Ohio was temporarily renamed to Twenty One Pilots Boulevard to celebrate two hometown shows at the Nationwide Arena in Columbus, where the band also opened up a pop-up shop named "Ned's Bayou", with both the name of the shop and the merch being based on the character that appeared in the music video for "Chlorine". On July 16, 2019, "The Hype" was sent to US alternative radio as the sixth and final single from Trench.

On April 9, 2020, the duo released the song "Level of Concern", which marked the first musical output by the duo since the release of Trench. "Level of Concern" references COVID-19 pandemic-induced anxiety, and its accompanying music video was filmed in Joseph and Dun's homes while they were under lockdown due to the pandemic. The duo made a separate music video for the song and released it in the form of a continuous stream. It was a "never-ending music video" and ran for 178 days, from June 22 to December 18, 2020. Guinness World Records certified it as the longest music video in history.

The duo later posted a video in June, as well as a photo with the code "LOC-491-555-09JKL", which could be typed into the band's website to unlock the first of 20 "USB drives" which were later revealed to be part of a scavenger hunt based around "Level of Concern." The ultimate reward for the scavenger hunt was exclusive digital content featured in all 20 zip drives, a video of Joseph congratulating fans for completing the scavenger hunt, and a spot in the "never-ending" stream of fan clips for "Level of Concern".

In November 2020, Dun revealed that the duo were still working "remotely" on their next album, with both members being in different locations due to the lockdown. He described the recording process: "we both have our own studios, which is really nice, so he comes up with a lot of stuff at his studio, sends it over to me, and then I come up with some stuff here at my studio and then send it back". On December 8, 2020, the band released a Christmas single, "Christmas Saves the Year", following a Twitch stream by Joseph.

=== 2021–2023: Scaled and Icy ===
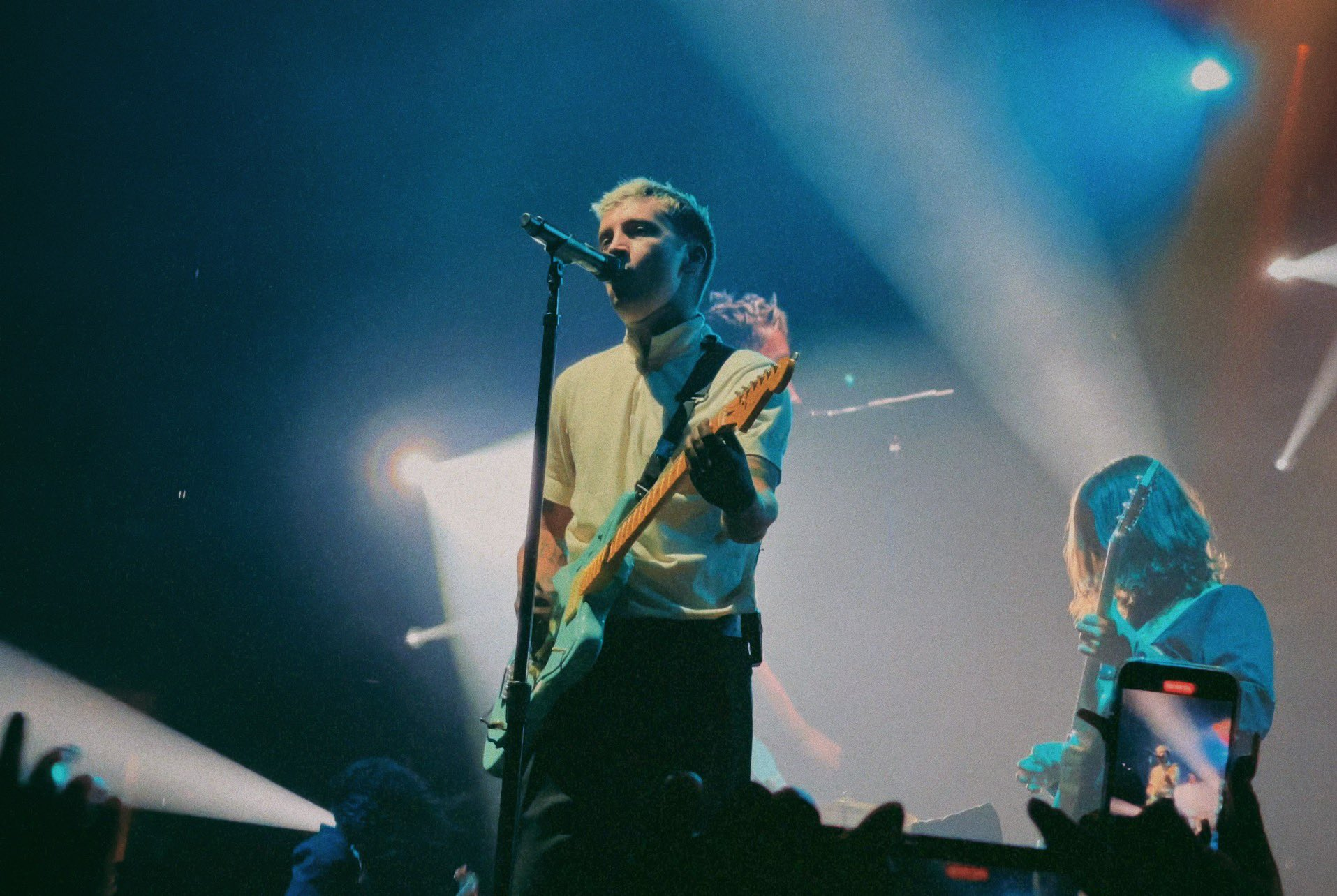
Twenty One Pilots performing during the Takeover Tour in September 2021

The duo's sixth studio album, Scaled and Icy, was released on May 21, 2021. The album's name is an anagram, which spells out "Clancy is dead", and is a play on the phrase "scaled back and isolated", due to the COVID-19 pandemic. The album was first teased on April 6, 2021, through dmaorg.info via a poster that included the text "New Album and Livestream Experience". The album was officially announced by the band the following day, alongside the release of its lead single, "Shy Away". The second single from the album, "Choker", was released on April 30, 2021. The third single from the album, "Saturday", was released on May 18, 2021; its music video followed on July 8.

Two days before the release of "Shy Away", the band announced a livestream concert to take place on May 21, 2021, coinciding with the album's release. The livestream, described as being "career-spanning", was held at Value City Arena and included live performances of songs from Scaled and Icy, as well as previous records. The show also introduced a new live touring band that would join the duo for future shows. On May 19, 2022, an extended cut of the concert with behind-the-scenes footage was released in over 1,000 theaters worldwide.

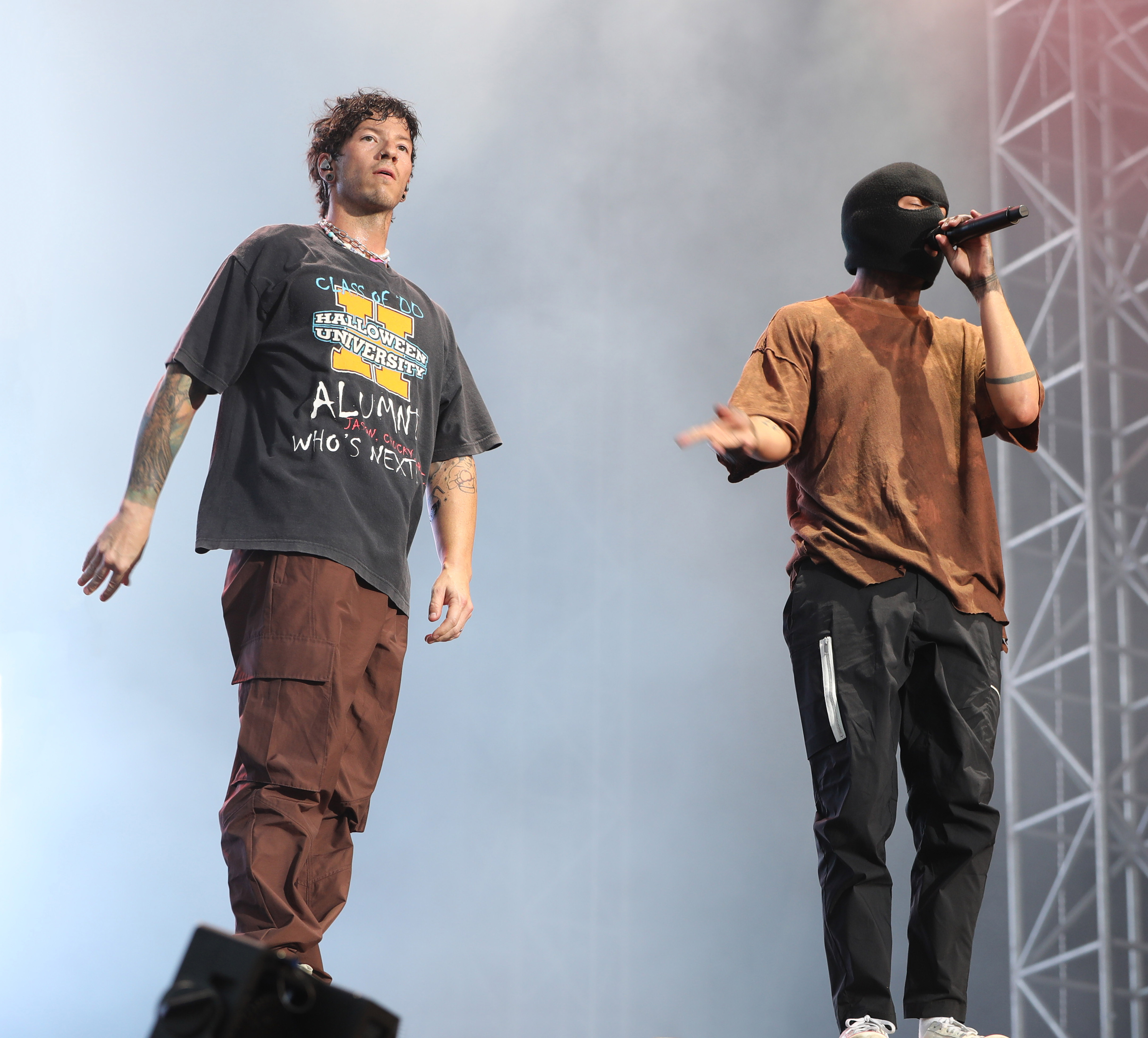
Dun and Joseph performing at Southside Festival 2022 in Germany

On June 16, 2021, the duo announced the Takeover Tour, during which they would spend a week in each city they visited, performing at small clubs as well as large venues. The tour began in Denver, Colorado in September 2021, and concluded in London on June 25, 2022. On July 23, 2021, Half Alive and Arrested Youth were announced as openers for the U.S. leg of the tour. On September 17, 2021, the duo held a virtual concert for the online video game Roblox.

On November 19, 2021, the duo released Scaled and Icy (Livestream Version), which features all of the songs from the livestream concert as well as "Level of Concern". A music video for "Christmas Saves the Year" was released on December 8, 2021 "The Outside" was issued as the album's fourth and final single on November 24, 2021, followed by a music video on March 18, 2022. On June 9, 2022, the duo performed new versions of several songs, both old and new, on MTV Unplugged. On July 22, 2022, the duo released a live performance video in collaboration with the Netflix series Stranger Things, in which they performed a mashup of the show's theme song and "Heathens". The Icy Tour, a re-branded second leg of the Takeover Tour focusing on arena shows, commenced in August 2022 and concluded that September. On May 9, 2022, Peter McPoland was announced as the opener for this leg of the tour.

On January 8, 2023, Vessel was re-released as a limited-edition vinyl box set, accompanied by a YouTube stream celebrating the tenth anniversary of its release; the livestream was a partnership and fundraiser for the Make-A-Wish Foundation. The box set was released on February 3, 2023.

=== 2024–present: Clancy and Breach ===
On February 15, 2024, the cover art of Vessel, Blurryface, Trench, and Scaled and Icy were updated to be partially covered in red tape on streaming platforms. Several people posted on social media that they had received mail from the band, and a new logo was revealed through billboards and posters in multiple locations worldwide over the following days, hinting at a forthcoming album. On February 22, a narrated video, titled "I Am Clancy", was released on the band's social media platforms, where details about the lore of the previous three albums were confirmed. On February 29, the duo's seventh studio album, Clancy, was announced for release on May 17; its lead single "Overcompensate" was released on the same day. The second single of the album, "Next Semester", was released on March 27. The third single, "Backslide", was released on April 25, with its video directed by Dun. "The Craving" was released as the fourth single on May 22, and a second version of the song, subtitled "(Jenna's Version)", is included in the album. Each song on the album, as well as the single version of "The Craving", was accompanied by a music video; the album's release was delayed by a week due to the timeframe required to complete them. The music videos were released alongside the album, with the exception of "Paladin Strait", whose video was released on June 21.

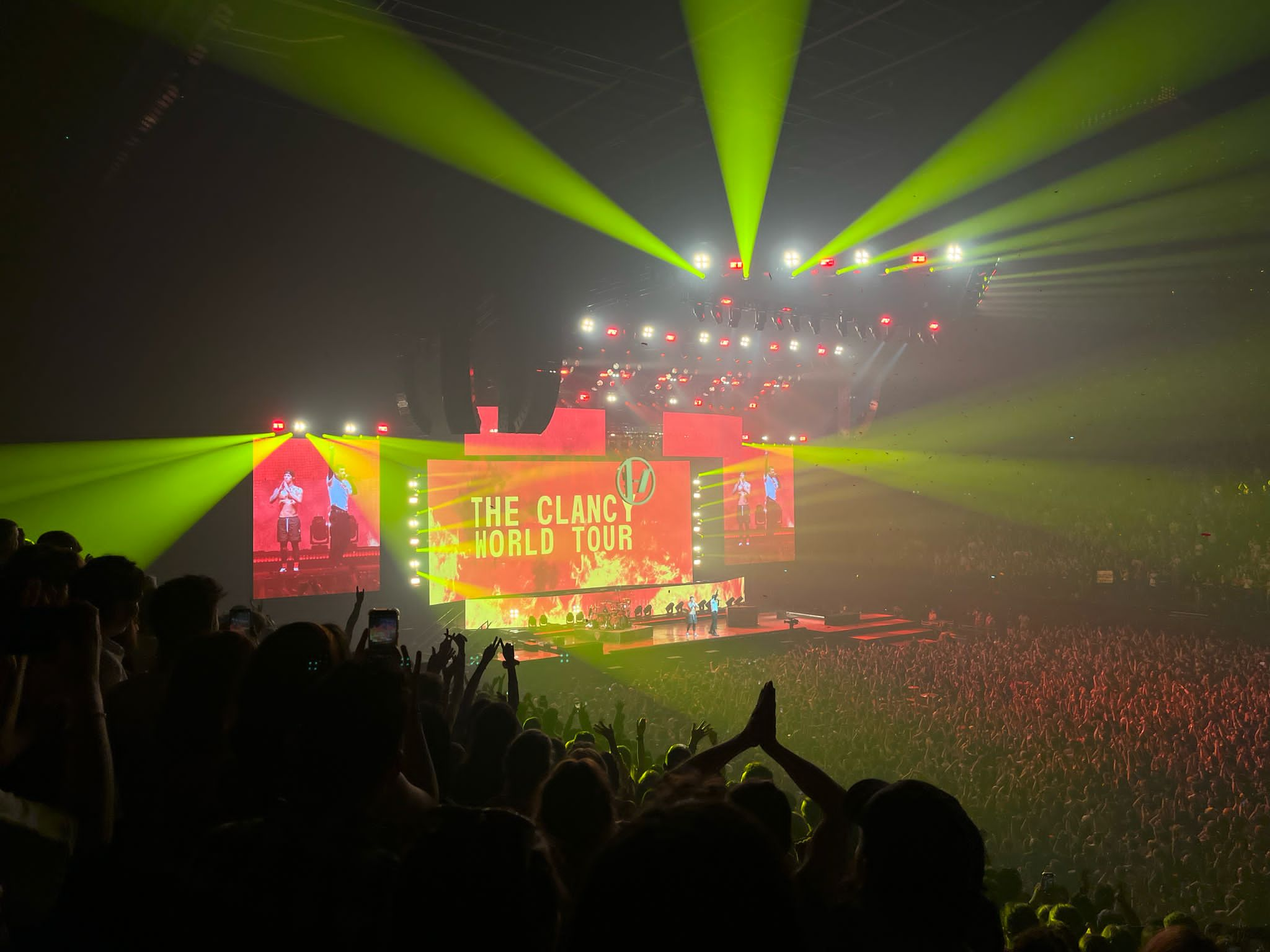
Twenty One Pilots performing during the Clancy World Tour in 2025

A concert tour in support of the album, the Clancy World Tour, began in August 2024 in Denver, Colorado, and concluded in May 2025 in London. New Zealand alt-pop band Balu Brigada was the opening act for the US leg of the tour; they also opened for the Australia & New Zealand, Latin American, and European tour legs. Five small-scale concerts collectively titled "An Evening with Twenty One Pilots" were held throughout May 2024, prior to the album's release. Performances of "Overcompensate", "Next Semester", "Backslide", and "The Craving" from the May concerts were included in an exclusive digital-only limited-edition version of Clancy titled Clancy: Digital Remains, released on May 30, before being taken down the next day. Digital Remains also included a 121-page booklet featuring alternate artwork, handwritten lyrics, photographs, and artifacts from when the band was formed.

After posting a cryptic image to their social media platforms, it was confirmed on September 12, 2024, that the duo would feature on the soundtrack for the second season of the Netflix series Arcane, with the song "The Line". The song was released on November 22, with an accompanying music video following three days later which includes relevant clips from the series, alongside new animations featuring Joseph. On September 19, the band appeared on The Tonight Show Starring Jimmy Fallon, performing "Routines in the Night". On October 4, while performing in Columbus, the band had announced that said show would be recorded for an upcoming live album. On December 12, 2024, the band performed "The Line" at The Game Awards 2024, alongside an orchestra. On April 9, 2025, while on stage in Łódź, Poland, the duo performed a demo of the Blurryface song "Doubt", which was released on streaming platforms following the show.

Twenty One Pilots performing in 2026

Breach, the duo's eighth studio album, was announced on May 21, 2025, and released on September 12. Its lead single, "The Contract", was released on June 12, followed by "Drum Show" as the second on August 18, and "City Walls" as the third on the day of the album's release. An additional leg of North American shows in support of Clancy as well as Breach, titled The Clancy Tour: Breach, ran from September 18 to October 26, with Dayglow as openers. At the 2025 Rock and Roll Hall of Fame Induction Ceremony on November 8, the duo performed a cover of "Seven Nation Army", originally sung by the White Stripes. Twenty One Pilots: More Than We Ever Imagined, a concert film documenting the Mexico City show of the Clancy World Tour on February 20, 2025, was theatrically released on February 26, 2026. On February 17, 2026, the duo officially released "Drag Path", a single formerly limited to those who had purchased it as part of Breach: Digital Remains which had since gained virality on social media. The group headlined festivals across the Americas and Europe from January to November 2026. On August 7, 2026, the duo released More Than We Ever Imagined as a live album. On October 17, the band performed a one-off concert at Ohio Stadium in their hometown of Columbus, Ohio, for their largest headlining concert by attendance, with Death Cab for Cutie and Emi Grace as supporting acts.

== Artistry ==
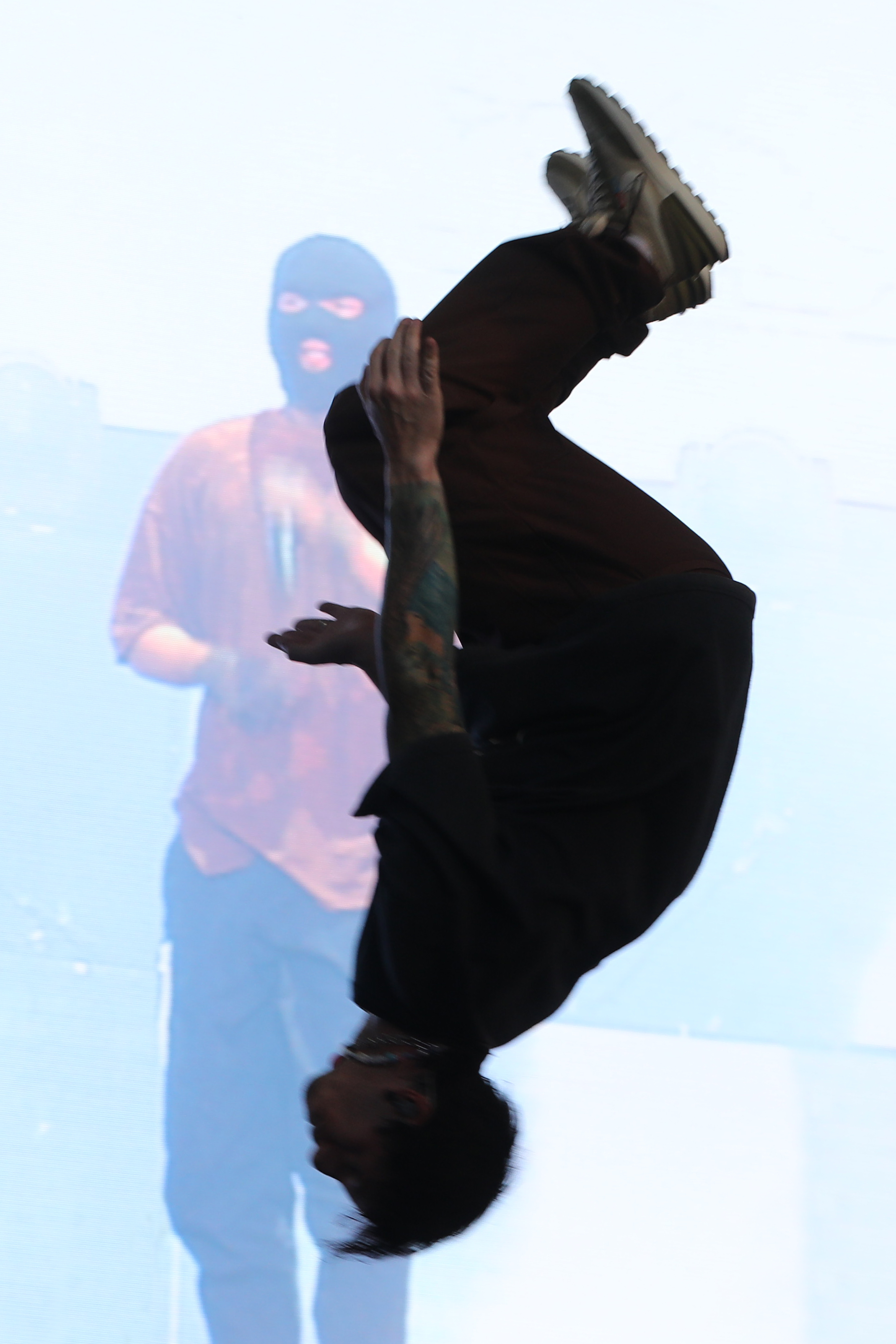
Twenty One Pilots is known for their physically active performances.

The duo grew up in strict Christian households where they had to either conceal their pop punk and hip hop albums from the censure of their parents, or find faith-friendly counterparts. Both still identify as Christians. According to Dun, "I'd hide albums like Green Day's Dookie under my bed. They'd find a Christian alternative, like Relient K, and make me listen to that." However, his parents eventually relaxed on rock music, even allowing Dun to assemble a live drum kit in their basement. Joseph's first favorite band was the Christian rap rock trio DC Talk. He taught himself the piano by playing along to songs on the radio by artists like the Beatles and Celine Dion.

=== Musical style ===
"Lane Boy"
"Lane Boy" is an alternative hip-hop track infused with reggae. The song both musically and lyrically scorns at the notion of staying in one's lane, expressing an unorthodox hybrid mix of musical styles as well as a mission statement. Tyler Joseph performs frenetic rapping in double-time in addition to singing at the chorus over hyperactive electronic beats.

The band's musical style has been described as alternative rock, electropop, alternative hip-hop, pop rap, indie pop, pop rock, rap rock, electronic rock, indie rock, hip-hop, emo, and indietronica. (Note: Musical styles: alternative rock, electropop, alternative hip-hop, pop rap; indie pop, pop rock, rap rock, electronic rock, indie rock, hip-hop, emo, indietronica) The duo has also experimented with electronica, reggae, EDM, pop, synth-pop, folk, R&B, techno, house, disco, hard rock, spoken word, psychedelic, post-punk, bedroom pop, garage rock, emo rap, nu metal and funk. (Note: Elements: electronica, reggae, EDM, pop, synth-pop, folk, R&B, techno, house, disco, hard rock, spoken word, psychedelic, post-punk, bedroom pop, garage rock, emo rap, nu metal, funk) Because their music contains a mix of many genres, the duo has been difficult to categorize.

The duo are most frequently categorized as alternative hip hop, a subgenre of hip hop known for its unconventional nature and blending of music styles. The music most often borrows from a wide variety of different genres, including hip hop, electropop, punk, rock, and reggae. Early material is considered post-emo, following bands such as My Chemical Romance and Dashboard Confessional, with show tune or glam rock aesthetics. At the time of their major-label debut album Vessel, Twenty One Pilots was described as an indie rock duo. The album featured a fusion of rap, piano pop, rock and electronica. Their breakthrough album Blurryface expressed elements of pop, EDM, breakbeat, reggae, and dancehall. Over time, hip hop has become an increasingly prominent musical influence for the band. Twenty One Pilots has since been hailed as a leading contemporary alternative rock group.

Despite their chart-topping dominance of rock charts, many of the duo's songs feature no guitar. Some listeners tend to question whether Twenty One Pilots constitute as rock, noting the duo generally neglect the use of guitar. However, it has started to become a more prominent instrument in more recent work, particularly since Scaled and Icy (2021).

During their songs, Joseph incorporates rapping, singing, and sometimes screaming. His rapping style has been compared to K'naan and Macklemore. However, Joseph doesn't consider himself a rapper, explaining that he never intended to be one, and simply finds the art-form of rap the most effective way of trying to say something with his songs. He realized how small the amount of lyrics in a full song is because they're sung and words are drawn out by melodies. When attempting to write poetry he had written for the lyrics of a song, Joseph found there were "way too many words to fit". He soon found himself just saying the poetry in tempo and realizing that he was rapping.

=== Lyrical themes ===
Joseph writes lyrics that are often psychodramatic in nature. He describes his songwriting as well as himself as "very dramatic." Joseph claims he began writing songs because there were things he wanted to say that he didn't know how to in a normal conversation. He is mostly inspired by chord progression and song structure, and his lyrics come afterwards. Dun's energetic drumming lays down a rhythm for Joseph as he shifts between the expressive lyrics of his verses and an almost melodic style of rapping during many of their songs.

"Stressed Out"
"Stressed Out" is an "ode to the innocence of childhood" according to the BBC. The song harbors a downbeat atmosphere, with lyrics that focus on personal themes.

Alongside their mixture of musical styles, the duo often use lyrics considered relatable. Joseph's lines convey personal turmoil and deep rooted insecurities. Their songs have moments where personal despair connect to a universal context, often relating to that of faith, location or community. From a more secular perspective, the lyrics center on depression and anxiety, with habitual reference to self-harm.

The themes most prevalent on the duo's major-label debut album, Vessel, were introspection and fear. Their next album, Blurryface, was a concept album in that it is shaped by themes regarding personal issues, such as insecurity. Blurryface is about Joseph attempting to defeat the alter ego of the titular monster-image representing his insecurities. This concept was further expanded in Trench and subsequent records until Breach, forming an alternate universe storyline centering around the fictional continent of "Trench", the city of "Dema", and the struggling factions of the "Banditos" and the "bishops"; one of the bishops is Nico, an alternative name for Blurryface.

== Name, iconography, and fandom ==
Twenty One Pilots' logo since 2024

According to the band, their purpose for making music is "to make people think" and encourage them to find joy in what they come to believe in life. Twenty One Pilots derives their band name and philosophy from literary origins. "Bicycle Thief" and "Chill Coat", a play on the last name of the band's lawyer, Jeff Chilcoat, were among some of the rejected band names. Joseph got the band's name and meaning from reading the 1947 theatrical play All My Sons, by American playwright Arthur Miller. In the story, the main protagonist is a defense contractor named Joe Keller who builds airplane parts for military aircraft. Upon discovering some are faulty and would fail if used, he must decide whether or not to recall them. Keller is forced to make a decision to either spend his money trying to repair the faulty parts or press forward and use them. Though he wants to do what's right, Keller is afraid to lose funds because he needs to support his family, so he decides to send the parts anyway, to Europe during World War II. As a consequence of his decision, twenty-one pilots die. At the end of the play, Keller commits suicide. Joseph explained that the story's themes of moral dilemma, between choosing the easy and the right decision, resonated with him and inspired the name and formation of the band. It showed Joseph that every decision he makes will have great outcomes or dire consequences. Joseph stated, "We're constantly faced with decisions. A lot of times, the right ones take more work, it takes longer to see benefit; they're the long route. We know in order to get where we want to be and do what we want to be doing, sometimes we have to do what we don't feel like doing. It takes hard work, and the band name is a constant reminder of that."

Former Twenty One Pilots member Chris Salih stated in an interview that Mark Eshleman, a longtime friend of and creative director for the band, created the band's logo by "messing around with shapes". Joseph found that the arrangement resonated with him.

Skeleton Clique logos

Twenty One Pilots has built a dedicated fanbase, which has been dubbed the "Skeleton Clique" or simply the Clique, in reference to the band's use of skeleton iconography in numerous performances, graphics, and music videos. The Clique is represented in the band's official iconography by logos of a skull and alien head atop lines resembling keys. In November 2016, during the Emotional Roadshow World Tour, the Wood Green tube station in London was decorated in Clique-related artwork, spanning over 100 advertising panels; a public art exhibition, titled "Artopia" and showcasing Clique-related artwork, was held at the Nationwide Arena as part of the "Tour De Columbus" run of shows that concluded the tour in June 2017.

According to Dun, "We played hardcore shows, hip hop shows, no one knew where to put us. But we've approached live shows as a way to build something from nothing." The duo usually perform with pre-recorded keyboard tracks and programmed beats rather than a full band. However, Dun also plays a live drum kit while triggering the pre-recorded backing tracks. He often breaks his performance up by using acrobatics, such as backflips. Meanwhile, Tyler Joseph wears masks and occasionally body makeup while rapping and singing. During some shows, Joseph wears a floral kimono onstage. Dun stated, "We thought it was kind of cool, new and different to wear masks onstage, but yeah, people were confused."

== Band members ==
Current

- Tyler Joseph – lead vocals, keyboards, piano, synthesizers, programming, sampler (2009–present); guitar, bass, ukulele (2011–present)
- Josh Dun – drums, percussion, trumpet, backing vocals (2011–present)

Former

- Chris Salih – drums, percussion, backing vocals (2009–2011)
- Nick Thomas – bass, keyboards, guitar, backing vocals (2009–2011)

Touring

- Skyler Acord – bass (2021–2023)
- Todd Gummerman – keyboards, guitar, backing vocals (2021–2023)
- Paul Meany – stage production, keyboards, backing vocals (2021–2023)
- Dan Geraghty – guitar (2021–2023)
- Jesse Blum – trumpet, keyboards (2021–2023) (other appearances; 2014, 2019–2020)
- Kenyon Dixon – backing vocals (2021)
- Danielle Withers – backing vocals (2021)

Timeline

== Discography ==
Studio albums

- Twenty One Pilots (2009)
- Regional at Best (2011)
- Vessel (2013)
- Blurryface (2015)
- Trench (2018)
- Scaled and Icy (2021)
- Clancy (2024)
- Breach (2025)

== Concert tours ==
=== Headlining ===
- Regional at Best Tour (with Challenger!) (2011)
- Mostly November Tour (2012)
- Trip for Concerts (2013)
- Quiet Is Violent World Tour (2014)
- Blurryface Tour (2015–2016)
- Emotional Roadshow World Tour (2016–2017)
- The Bandito Tour (2018–2019)
- Takeover Tour (2021–2022)
- The Icy Tour (2022)
- The Clancy World Tour (2024–2025)

=== Opening act ===
- Nylon Music Tour for Neon Trees, alongside Walk the Moon (2012)
- Save Rock and Roll Tour for Fall Out Boy, alongside Panic! at the Disco (2013)
- The Self-Titled Tour for Paramore (2013–2014)

== See also ==
- List of songs recorded by Twenty One Pilots
- List of artists who reached number one on the U.S. alternative rock chart
- List of best-selling singles in the United States
- List of best-selling singles
- List of most-streamed songs on Spotify
- List of most-streamed artists on Spotify
- List of American Grammy Award winners and nominees
- Global Recording Artist of the Year
- Music of Ohio
