= Quiet Is Violent World Tour =

2014 concert tour by Twenty One Pilots

- Tour by Twenty One Pilots
- Location: North America; Europe; South America
- Associated album: Vessel
- Start date: September 4, 2014
- End date: November 21, 2014
- Legs: 2
- No. of shows: 39
- Supporting acts: MisterWives; Vinyl Theatre

Twenty One Pilots concert chronology
- Trip for Concerts (2013–14); Quiet Is Violent World Tour (2014); Blurryface Tour (2015-16)

Quiet Is Violent World Tour (stylized as quiet is viølent world tour) was the second concert tour by the American musical duo Twenty One Pilots, in support of their third studio album Vessel (2013). The tour began on September 4, 2014, in Columbus, and concluded on November 21, 2014, in Mexico City.

== Background ==
To help support Vessel, the band toured internationally throughout the year. Twenty One Pilots played a number of music festivals and other events all around the country which focused mainly on the album, such as Lollapalooza, Bonnaroo, Boston Calling, and Firefly. On August 19, it was announced on the band's Facebook account that American indie pop band MisterWives and indie rock band Vinyl Theatre would be joining as act supporters for the tour. As a result, they took the show requests from different cities and blended them into the Quiet Is Violent World Tour, which began in September 4, and ended in November 21.

== Shows ==
List of concerts showing date, city, country and venue
Date	City	Country	Venue
North America
September 4, 2014	Columbus, Ohio	United States	LC Pavilion
September 5, 2014	Columbus, Ohio	United States	LC Pavilion
September 6, 2014	Pittsburgh	United States	Stage AE
September 7, 2014	Boston	United States	Boston Calling
September 9, 2014	Clifton Park, New York	United States	Upstate Concert Hall
September 10, 2014	Rochester, New York	United States	Main Street Armory
September 11, 2014	Cleveland	United States	Jacobs Pavilion at Nautica
September 14, 2014	Kansas City, Missouri	United States	Uptown Theater
September 15, 2015	Tulsa, Oklahoma	United States	Cain's Ballroom
September 16, 2014	Memphis, Tennessee	United States	Minglewood Hall
September 18, 2014	Orlando, Florida	United States	House of Blues
September 19, 2014	Birmingham, Alabama	United States	Iron City
September 20, 2014	Atlanta	United States	Music Midtown
September 21, 2014	Nashville, Tennessee	United States	Marathon Music Works
September 23, 2014	Washington, D.C.	United States	9:30 Club
September 24, 2014	Washington, D.C.	United States	9:30 Club
September 25, 2014	New York City	United States	Terminal 5
September 27, 2014	Philadelphia	United States	Tower Theater
September 28, 2014	Philadelphia	United States	Tower Theater
October 1, 2014	Grand Rapids, Michigan	United States	Orbit Room
October 2, 2014	Detroit	United States	The Fillmore
October 3, 2014	Chicago	United States	Aragon Ballroom
October 4, 2014	Milwaukee	United States	Eagles Ballroom
October 5, 2014	Ames, Iowa	United States	Iowa State University
October 7, 2014	Tucson, Arizona	United States	Rialto Theatre
October 8, 2014	Los Angeles	United States	Hollywood Palladium
October 10, 2014	Seattle	United States	Neptune Theatre
October 11, 2014	Portland, Oregon	United States	Roseland Theater
October 12, 2014	Spokane, Washington	United States	Knitting Factory
October 13, 2014	Vancouver	Canada	Rio Theatre
October 16, 2014	Dallas	United States	House of Blues
October 17, 2014	Dallas	United States	House of Blues
October 18, 2014	Austin, Texas	United States	Stubb's Bar-B-Q
October 19, 2014	Houston	United States	House of Blues
October 22, 2014	College Stadium, Texas	United States	Rudder Auditorium
October 31, 2014	New Orleans		Voodoo Music Experience
November 21, 2014	Mexico City	Mexico	El Plaza Condesa
Europe
November 6, 2014	Vienna	Austria	Flex
November 7, 2014	Munich	Germany	Ampere
November 8, 2014	Cologne	Germany	Werkstatt
November 10, 2014	Amsterdam	Netherlands	Paradiso
November 11, 2014	Antwerp	Belgium	Trix Club
November 12, 2014	Paris	France	Maroquinerie
November 14, 2014	London	England	Electric
November 16, 2014	Dublin	Ireland	The Academy
November 17, 2014	Belfast	Northern Ireland	Mandela Hall
