= Christmas Saves the Year =

Twenty One Pilots song

Single by Twenty One Pilots
- Released: December 8, 2020
- Recorded: 2020
- Genre: Christmas; Lo-fi
- Length: 3:32
- Label: Fueled by Ramen
- Songwriter(s): Tyler Joseph
- Producer(s): Tyler Joseph

Twenty One Pilots singles chronology
| "Level of Concern" (2020) | "Christmas Saves the Year" (2020) | "Shy Away" (2021) |

Music video
- "Christmas Saves the Year" on YouTube

"Christmas Saves the Year" is a Christmas single by American musical duo Twenty One Pilots, released on December 8, 2020, through Fueled by Ramen. Written and recorded during the COVID-19 pandemic, the song expresses the idea that even in a turbulent year, optimism can still be found in Christmas.

== Background ==
"Christmas Saves the Year" was written, composed and recorded in lead singer Tyler Joseph's home studio. Twenty One Pilots debuted the track at the end of a Twitch stream in which Joseph played in the Chipotle Challenger Fortnite series tournament to raise money for the Make-A-Wish Foundation, after having teased "a gift" for the viewers of the stream.

Originally reluctant to write a Christmas song, Joseph was inspired as he was "experiencing Christmas through a little girl's perspective", in reference to his eldest daughter, Rosie. The sound of the track was inspired by a musical instrument called the Mellotron.

== Composition ==
"Christmas Saves the Year" is a lo-fi Christmas song. Joseph wrote the song from the perspective of his "friends who live in some bigger cities that have these small apartments", and are "trying to weigh the options of whether or not they should see their family this year."

== Music video ==
Following the end of frontman Tyler Joseph's Twitch stream, the song and its visualizer video were released and made available on music-streaming services, and a premiere for the video was placed onto YouTube. The video was directed and animated by Johnny Chew. An official music video for the song was released on December 8, 2021, one year after the song was released, and heavily utilizes claymation. It was directed and animated by Mr. Oz.

Joseph's wife Jenna posted an unofficial music video to her Instagram account on January 15, 2021, showcasing Rosie in the family home.

== Charts ==
Chart performance for "Christmas Saves the Year"
| Chart (2020–2021) | Peak position |
|---|---|
| Canada Hot AC (Billboard) | 44 |
| Canada Rock (Billboard) | 44 |
| US Holiday Digital Song Sales (Billboard) | 34 |
| US Hot Rock & Alternative Songs (Billboard) | 35 |
