= Choker (song) =

Twenty One Pilots song

Single by Twenty One Pilots

from the album Scaled and Icy
- Released: April 30, 2021
- Recorded: 2021
- Studio: Tyler Joseph's home studio (Columbus, Ohio)
- Genre: Synth-pop, pop-rap
- Length: 3:43
- Label: Fueled by Ramen
- Songwriter: Tyler Joseph
- Producer: Tyler Joseph

Twenty One Pilots singles chronology
"Shy Away" (2021)	"Choker" (2021)	"Saturday" (2021)

Music video
- "Choker" on YouTube

"Choker" is a song written and recorded by American musical duo Twenty One Pilots. It was released through Fueled by Ramen on April 30, 2021, as the second single from their sixth studio album, Scaled and Icy (2021). A music video accompanied the single's release.

== Background ==
Regarding the writing process of the track, Joseph described it as a "rash" for referring him to dig back into older songwriting habits and methods. He explained: "...It's another thing when [a song] comes up organically – almost like an old habit that is inevitably a part of who you are, and still makes up the fibres of who you are. It's mostly dormant, but every once in a while it flares up. That's what "Choker" is: a flare up of an old rash that we thought we cured. And we're proud of that rash! We like that rash. The rash is who we are. We had to itch it."

In the same interview, Tyler recalled: "I remember when I locked into the writing of [the song], it just flowed; it was scary how easy that song was for me to write, and it was because I knew I was coming from a place, and I was in a realm that I had spent a lot of time in before. And I was comfortable there; I was familiar with my surroundings. And that's why it was such an easy song to write." He also stated that, although the band is evolving and maturing, he doesn't need to not look back to his old writing styles previously established on pre-Blurryface albums, such as Twenty One Pilots, Regional at Best and Vessel. "I think "Choker" is the beginning of me being okay with the entire body of work, and feeling like I don't have to steer away from some things that people would consider from our older records."

== Music video ==
The video, directed by Mark C. Eshleman, was filmed at Big Fun, a toy store located in Columbus, Ohio, the hometown of members Tyler Joseph and Josh Dun. Joseph plays an anxious customer who is interested in a small blue dragon named Trash, inside of a display case, and Dun plays the emotionless shopkeeper. Joseph steals the toy leading Dun to chase him down, eventually capturing him with a net gun before transforming him into a toy by emitting blue rays from his eyes and mouth. As of January 28, 2026, the video has garnered over 29 million views.

== Personnel ==
Credits adapted from the liner notes of Scaled and Icy.

=== Twenty One Pilots ===
- Tyler Joseph – vocals, guitar, bass, piano, keyboards, organs, synthesizers, programming, production
- Josh Dun – drums, percussion, drum engineering

=== Additional musicians ===
- Matt Pauling – violin, drum engineering

== Charts ==
Chart performance for "Choker"
Chart (2021)	Peak position
Czech Republic Singles Digital (ČNS IFPI)	46
Global 200 (Billboard)	149
Ireland (IRMA)	83
Lithuania (AGATA)	90
Slovakia (Singles Digitál Top 100)	79
UK Singles (Official Charts)	88
US Hot Rock & Alternative Songs (Billboard)	14
