= Shy Away =

Twenty One Pilots song

- Livestream version cover

Single by Twenty One Pilots

from the album Scaled and Icy
- Released: April 7, 2021
- Recorded: 2020–2021
- Genre: Synth-pop; alternative rock; indie rock; pop rock; new wave
- Length: 2:55 (album version); 6:01 (MTV Unplugged version)
- Label: Fueled by Ramen
- Songwriter: Tyler Joseph
- Producer: Tyler Joseph

Twenty One Pilots singles chronology
"Christmas Saves the Year" (2020)	"Shy Away" (2021)	"Choker" (2021)

Music video
- "Shy Away" on YouTube

"Shy Away" is a song written and recorded by American musical duo Twenty One Pilots. It was released through Fueled by Ramen on April 7, 2021, as the lead single of their sixth studio album, Scaled and Icy (2021). A music video was released alongside the single, directed by Miles Cable and AJ Favicchio.

== Background ==
Official logo used for "Shy Away"

Tyler Joseph, the frontman of the duo, wrote "Shy Away" for his younger brother, Jay Joseph, as a tutorial on how to operate a recording studio. During the recording, Joseph's daughter made a cooing noise which Joseph decided to keep in the song.

The song was created while communicating virtually as the COVID-19 pandemic limited interaction between the members of the band. It was released two days after the announcement of Scaled and Icy, the band's sixth studio album.

== Composition ==
"Shy Away" is a "propulsive" synth-pop, alternative rock, indie rock, pop rock, and new wave song that runs for a duration of two minutes and fifty-five seconds. According to the sheet music published at Musicnotes.com by Alfred Music, it is written in the time signature of common time at a tempo of 196 beats per minute. "Shy Away" is composed in the key of C major, while Joseph's vocal range spans one octave and four notes, from a low E_{3} to a high of A_{4}.

The track includes a "brief but tasteful" half-time breakdown for the "hardcore kids", and has been compared to the likes of artists such as the Strokes and Phoenix. It's considered to be one of the band's most upbeat songs, and is synth-heavy, with elements of electronic, pop and indie music.

== Music video ==
The music video for the song, directed by Miles Cable and AJ Favicchio, was released concurrently with the song. The video showcases the duo's new "era", and a new color scheme which changes during each album cycle. The video features the new colors prominently: vibrant shades of light blue, pink and occasional yellow. In the video, a few background musicians portrayed by Joseph and Dun wear torn and burnt ski masks, a reference to the stylings of their earlier albums, Vessel and Blurryface. As of December 2025, the video has surpassed 59 million views on YouTube.

== Commercial performance ==
Within only two days of tracking, "Shy Away" made its debut at No. 20 on the US Billboard Hot Rock & Alternative Songs chart, and reached a peak of No. 7. On the Alternative Airplay chart, the song peaked at No. 1, and remained at the peak position for 8 weeks. On the Rock Airplay chart, the track also reached No. 1. In its first full week of tracking, it reached No. 56 in both the United Kingdom and Ireland, and peaked at No. 36 in Lithuania. On the chart dated April 24, 2021, the song made its debut on the US Billboard Hot 100 at No. 87, also being the only track from the album to chart there, before it fell out the week after.

== Personnel ==
Credits adapted from the liner notes of Scaled and Icy.

- Tyler Joseph – vocals, guitar, bass, piano, keyboards, synthesizers, programming, production
- Josh Dun – drums, percussion, drum engineering

== Charts ==
=== Weekly charts ===
Weekly chart performance for "Shy Away"
Chart (2021)	Peak position
Austria (Ö3 Austria Top 40)	57
Belgium (Ultratip Bubbling Under Flanders)	4
Canada Hot 100 (Billboard)	67
Canada Rock (Billboard)	14
Croatia International Airplay (Top lista)	99
Czech Republic Airplay (ČNS IFPI)	15
Czech Republic Singles Digital (ČNS IFPI)	35
Global 200 (Billboard)	73
Hungary (Stream Top 40)	32
Ireland (IRMA)	56
Lithuania (AGATA)	36
Mexico Ingles Airplay (Billboard)	12
New Zealand Hot Singles (RMNZ)	9
Slovakia Singles Digital (ČNS IFPI)	38
Sweden Heatseeker (Sverigetopplistan)	11
Switzerland (Schweizer Hitparade)	90
UK Singles (Official Charts)	56
US Billboard Hot 100	87
US Hot Rock & Alternative Songs (Billboard)	7
US Rock & Alternative Airplay (Billboard)	1
Venezuela Airplay (Record Report)	48

=== Year-end charts ===
Year-end chart performance for "Shy Away"
Chart (2021)	Position
US Hot Rock & Alternative Songs (Billboard)	31
US Rock Airplay (Billboard)	7

== Certifications ==
Certifications and sales for "Shy Away"
Region	Certification	Certified units/sales
Brazil (Pro-Música Brasil)	Platinum	40,000^{‡}
Canada (Music Canada)	Gold	40,000^{‡}
United States (RIAA)	Gold	500,000^{‡}
^{‡} Sales+streaming figures based on certification alone.
