= Saturday (Twenty One Pilots song) =

Twenty One Pilots song

Single by Twenty One Pilots

from the album Scaled and Icy
- Released: May 18, 2021
- Recorded: 2020–2021
- Studio: Tyler Joseph's home studio (Columbus, Ohio)
- Genre: Alternative pop; funk; pop rock; pop
- Length: 2:52
- Label: Fueled by Ramen
- Songwriter: Tyler Joseph
- Producers: Tyler Joseph; Paul Meany; Greg Kurstin (co.)

Twenty One Pilots singles chronology
"Choker" (2021)	"Saturday" (2021)	"The Outside" (2021)

Music video
- "Saturday" on YouTube

"Saturday" is a song recorded by American musical duo Twenty One Pilots, released on May 18, 2021, through Fueled by Ramen, as the third single from their sixth studio album, Scaled and Icy (2021). It was written and produced by the duo's frontman, Tyler Joseph, with Greg Kurstin and Paul Meany credited as co-producers. A music video for the song was released on July 8, 2021.

On August 31, 2021, the song became the ninth by the duo to peak at No. 1 on the US Alternative Airplay chart.

== Background ==
The song's bridge features an audio clip of a phone call with Tyler Joseph's wife Jenna, with her encouraging Joseph to move on with the creation of the track. Joseph stated that he was recording and decided it fit perfectly in the song. Jenna wanted to re-record the audio, as she didn't like the way it sounded, but Joseph convinced her to keep it.

The song was created while communicating virtually as the COVID-19 pandemic limited interaction between the members of the band.

== Composition ==
"Saturday" is an Alternative pop and funk song that runs for a duration of two minutes and fifty-two seconds. It is considered a very upbeat song in contrast to the themes of their previous albums Trench and Blurryface while having the same messages in the form of hidden undertones. Joseph stated in an interview that he did not want to "hold a mirror up to our circumstances and create a record exactly as it appeared in front of us", continuing "I didn't think that a dismal record was appropriate; the idea of escaping that was more appealing to me. The reason why it feels almost disconnected from the reality in which the record was created is intentional. It's gonna feel a little lighter because of that."

== Music video ==
Upon the release of "Saturday", Twenty One Pilots released a lyric video to promote the song. It shows depictions of 1980s synthwave-esque imagery, paired with the colors of Scaled and Icy – predominantly soft shades of pink, blue and yellow.

The official music video directed by Andrew Donoho was released on July 8, 2021, and filmed in San Diego, California. It is a continuation of the "Levitate" music video and it features frontman Tyler Joseph and bandmate Josh Dun performing the song atop a submarine as people are entering, before the camera pans to the interior, in which a party is occurring and the duo are performing. Moments later, a gigantic sea dragon known as Trash the Dragon deliberately crashes into the submarine, causing it to break and begin to flood as the duo continue their performance submerged in water while the guests panic. Eventually, the band manages to escape from the sinking vehicle, and emerges on the surface. The video ends with the sea dragon swimming by, underneath the duo and remaining guests.

== Usage in media ==
"Saturday" appears on the soundtrack for the Electronic Arts video game NHL 22, released in October 2021.

The song is featured on ESPN's College Gameday programme as a music bed for its Inside Gameday feature, which airs just before the programme’s first commercial break. The lyrics are faded out until the first main chorus with the refrain heard before the programme throws to the commercial break.

== Personnel ==
Credits adapted from the liner notes of Scaled and Icy.

=== Twenty One Pilots ===
- Tyler Joseph – lead vocals, guitar, bass, organs, keyboards, synthesizers, programming, production
- Josh Dun – drums, percussion, trumpet

=== Former Band Members ===
- Chris Salih – drums
- Nick Thomas – bass

=== Additional musicians ===
- Paul Meany – production, synthesizers
- Greg Kurstin – production, programming

== Charts ==
=== Weekly charts ===
Weekly chart performance for "Saturday"
Chart (2021)	Peak position
Canada AC (Billboard)	40
Canada CHR/Top 40 (Billboard)	39
Canada Hot AC (Billboard)	34
Canada Rock (Billboard)	32
Czech Republic Singles Digital (ČNS IFPI)	81
Global 200 (Billboard)	159
Hungary (Rádiós Top 40)	29
New Zealand Hot Singles (RMNZ)	14
UK Singles (Official Charts)	97
US Bubbling Under Hot 100 (Billboard)	4
US Adult Pop Airplay (Billboard)	9
US Hot Rock & Alternative Songs (Billboard)	10
US Pop Airplay (Billboard)	24
US Rock & Alternative Airplay (Billboard)	5

=== Year-end charts ===
Year-end chart performance for "Saturday"
Chart (2021)	Position
US Hot Rock & Alternative Songs (Billboard)	25
US Rock Airplay (Billboard)	18

== Certifications ==
Certifications and sales for "Saturday"
Region	Certification	Certified units/sales
Brazil (Pro-Música Brasil)	Gold	20,000^{‡}
United States (RIAA)	Gold	500,000^{‡}
^{‡} Sales+streaming figures based on certification alone.

== Release history ==
Release history for "Saturday"
Region	Date	Format	Label	Ref.
Various	May 18, 2021	Digital download; streaming	Fueled by Ramen	
United States	July 20, 2021	Contemporary hit radio	Fueled by Ramen	
