= The Outside (song) =

Twenty One Pilots song

Single by Twenty One Pilots

from the album Scaled and Icy
- Released: November 24, 2021
- Recorded: 2020–2021
- Studio: Tyler Joseph's home studio (Columbus, Ohio)
- Genre: Synth-pop; funk-pop; rap rock
- Length: 3:36
- Label: Fueled by Ramen
- Songwriter: Tyler Joseph
- Producer: Tyler Joseph

Twenty One Pilots singles chronology
| "Saturday" (2021) | "The Outside" (2021) | "Overcompensate" (2024) |

Music video
- "The Outside" on YouTube

"The Outside" is a song written and recorded by American musical duo Twenty One Pilots. It was released through Fueled by Ramen on November 24, 2021, as the fourth and final single from their sixth studio album, Scaled and Icy (2021). The song was written and produced by the duo's frontman, Tyler Joseph. A music video for the song was released on March 18, 2022. It became their tenth song to top the Alternative Songs chart in the United States.

== Music video ==
The music video for "The Outside" was directed by Andrew Donoho and was released on March 18, 2022. It is a continuation of the video for "Saturday", and draws much of its plot from the lore established in Twenty One Pilots' preceding album, Trench (2018).

The video begins with a scene of a sea dragon, which fades into a room housing the nine bishops in the fictional dystopia of Dema that proceed to execute the bishop named Keons, who is shown to have been the one controlling the dragon. The scene then cuts to Joseph washing up on the shore of an island, which goes by the name of "Voldsøy", located beside the conceptual continent known as "Trench". Dun finds Joseph and the two set off for a cave where antlered creatures reside; this creature has notably appeared in the video for "Chlorine", where it is named Ned. Joseph sits down with the creatures and drinks an unknown substance they give to him, and follows one out of the cave. One of the creatures gives him their antlers and disappear. Joseph then lifts the antlers above his head, which allows him to seize control of the dead bishop in Dema. He uses this power to destroy one of the neon lights in the bishop's room, then releases the bishop from control before the now broken light causes a fire to break out. The video cuts to a shot of Joseph and Dun standing side by side in the night, looking off into the distance as they spot the torches of the "Banditos", a legendary rebel group who prepares to spark a rebellion against the city of Dema. The video end with a certain duo of Banditos who spot Joseph and Dun, and as they look back at the immolated Dema, it is revealed that they are the same duo from the end of the video for "Nico and the Niners".

== Live performances ==
On December 16, 2021, the Twenty One Pilots YouTube channel released a video of the band performing the song at the Corona Capital Festival in Mexico City, Mexico.

== Charts ==
Chart performance for "The Outside"
| Chart (2021–2022) | Peak position |
|---|---|
| Canada Rock (Billboard) | 30 |
| New Zealand Hot Singles (RMNZ) | 18 |
| US Hot Rock & Alternative Songs (Billboard) | 28 |
| US Rock & Alternative Airplay (Billboard) | 3 |

== Release history ==
Release history for "The Outside"
| Region | Date | Format | Label | Ref. |
|---|---|---|---|---|
| Various | May 21, 2021 | Digital download; streaming | Fueled by Ramen | |
| United States | November 24, 2021 | Alternative radio | Fueled by Ramen | |
