= Level of Concern =

Twenty One Pilots song

Single by Twenty One Pilots

from the album Scaled and Icy (Livestream Version)
- Released: April 9, 2020
- Recorded: 2020
- Genre: Dance-pop; dance-rock; disco; pop rock
- Length: 3:40
- Label: Fueled by Ramen
- Songwriter: Tyler Joseph
- Producers: Tyler Joseph; Paul Meany (co.)

Twenty One Pilots singles chronology
"The Hype" (2019)	"Level of Concern" (2020)	"Christmas Saves the Year" (2020)

Music video
- "Level of Concern" on YouTube

"Level of Concern" is a song written and recorded by American musical duo Twenty One Pilots. It was released as a standalone single on April 9, 2020, through Fueled by Ramen, and was later included on a reissue of their sixth studio album, Scaled and Icy (2021).

"Level of Concern" is a dance-pop, pop rock and dance-rock song produced by lead singer Tyler Joseph alongside Paul Meany of alternative rock band Mutemath, and its lyrics revolve around the COVID-19 pandemic during which it was written and recorded. The song encourages hope during challenging times, while also addressing the widespread fear and panic associated with the pandemic. A portion of the song's proceeds were donated to Crew Nation, a global relief fund by Live Nation for touring and venue personnel affected by the pandemic. A music video for the track was uploaded upon the single's release. The song was a moderate mainstream hit, peaking at number 23 on the Billboard Hot 100, which made it the duo's fourth-highest-charting song behind "Stressed Out", "Heathens" and "Ride".

== Background and recording ==
At the beginning of March 2020, the number of confirmed COVID-19 cases in the United States stood at 70, but by the following month it had grown by hundreds of thousands with an increasing death rate, resulting in the closure of schools and the banning of large gatherings. Social distancing measures, such as staying home as much as possible, had been widely recommended, and gatherings of over 10 people had been discouraged. Twenty One Pilots wrote and recorded "Level of Concern", their first new release since their fifth studio album Trench (2018), in self-isolation. Lead singer Tyler Joseph's mother and wife, in part, influenced his decision to write a song about the pandemic.

"Level of Concern" was written by Joseph, who produced it alongside Paul Meany of the alternative rock band Mutemath. The two had previously collaborated in this capacity on Trench, but the song is a departure from the conceptual nature of that record as well as its predecessor Blurryface (2015). On April 6, Joseph disclosed on Twitter that it was the first song he had written on an electric guitar, although he needed "a few days to finish it up". He added that he would send his bandmate Josh Dun the files for the song. The song was released as a standalone single three days later. A portion of the revenue generated by the single was donated to Crew Nation, a global relief fund by Live Nation for touring and venue personnel affected by the pandemic.

== Composition ==
"Level of Concern" is defined as a dance-pop, pop rock and dance-rock song with elements of funk, pop and soft rock that runs for a duration of three minutes and forty seconds. According to the sheet music published at Musicnotes.com by Alfred Music, it is written in the time signature of common time, with a moderately fast tempo of 122 beats per minute. "Level of Concern" is composed in the key of E minor, while Tyler Joseph's vocal range spans two octaves, from the low-note of D_{3} to the high-note of D_{5}. The song has a basic sequence of C_{maj7}–Bm_{7}–Am_{7} in the introduction and verses, alternates between the chords of C_{maj7} and Am_{7} during the pre-chorus, and follows Em–C–Am–G–D at the refrain, bridge and outro as its chord progression.

The musical arrangement has an "upbeat groove" built around a "shimmering disco-esque guitar" before a beat played by Dun is added. Entertainment Weekly's Omar Sanchez compared its groove to the band's single "Ride", while Billboard journalist Chris Payne opined that the beat had "strong "Walking on a Dream" vibes," and also dubbed the single a "hashtag-2020 song" due to its frequent references to the pandemic. The lyrics focus on finding hope and optimism in difficult times, with Joseph describing it as "simple but hopeful," but are "still earnest and honest about the chaos everywhere." Chris Willman of Variety considered that the upbeat instrumental assuages the "anxiety" found in the lyrics, which also discuss "finding the right bunker-mate" with lines such as "would you be my little quarantine".

== Critical reception ==
Chris Payne of Billboard described "Level of Concern" as a "bop" with a "nimble" chorus, while Caryn Ganz called it "a delicious bit of '80s pop-funk that revels in its simplicity" in her assessment for The New York Times. Variety's Chris Willman found that, rather than being a "quick novelty knock-off" about quarantining, the track sounded "fully produced". Jason Lipshutz, also of Billboard, claimed that the track is "the first true anthem of the coronavirus age", and speculated that it could become a commercial success due to it having a more radio-friendly style than Trench, as well as "words that anyone could relate to at this moment". Similarly, Entertainment Weekly's Omar Sanchez dubbed it "the first quarantine anthem".

== Commercial performance ==
Despite not registering a full week of tracking activity, "Level of Concern" debuted at number three on the Bubbling Under Hot 100 chart (an extension of the Billboard Hot 100), number two on the Hot Rock Songs chart and number nineteen on the Alternative Songs chart in the United States with 7,000 digital sales. In its first full week of tracking, the track entered the Billboard Hot 100 at number twenty-three with 10.6 million streams and 12,000 downloads, making it their second-highest debut on that chart, and unseated Panic! at the Disco's "High Hopes" from the top of the Hot Rock Songs chart, becoming the first song at number one on the chart not by Panic! at the Disco since November 2018. It also became their seventh number-one hit on the Alternative Songs chart, making them the seventh band with the most number-one hits on the chart at the time, which they are now the fourth as of 2022.

In late 2023, for the 35th anniversary of Alternative Airplay, Billboard published a list of the top 100 most successful songs in the chart's history; "Level of Concern" was ranked at number 26.

== Music video ==
The music video for "Level of Concern" was shared upon the song's release on April 9, 2020, and was directed by frequent collaborator Mark Eshleman of Reel Bear Media. It features additional appearances from Joseph's wife Jenna, their daughter Rosie, and Dun's wife Debby Ryan. It loosely documents the creation of the song and video as Joseph and Dun individually record and film their parts, uploading the audio and video onto a USB flash drive and sending it via snail-mail (although it is revealed that the two are living next door to each other at the end of the video). This is cut between clips of Joseph and Dun spending time with their respective partners and decorating their houses with flashing lights and fluorescent stars.

A separate music video for the song was released in the form of a continuous stream of clips contributed by fans alongside the duo. Dubbed the "never-ending music video", it ran for 178 days, from June 22 to December 18, 2020. Guinness World Records certified it as the longest music video in history, surpassing the record previously held by the 24-hour music video for Pharrell Williams's "Happy" (2013).

== Alternate reality game ==
On June 12, 2020, a subset of the official Twenty One Pilots website began to accept alphanumerical codes in a specific format: "LOC-XXX-XXX-XXXXY", with "X" being digits and "Y" being letters. These events followed a Tweet made on the official band account that included a code in the format reading, "LOC-061-220-2012P". Fans determined that the code translated to June 12, 2020, at 12:00, which was when the YouTube livestream began and the website began to accept codes. The livestream, which streamed from the official band account and ultimately lasted 24 hours, included clues to codes, although later codes were more dependent on files that users unlocked and downloaded through the website using the previous codes. These file downloads included clues that became progressively more difficult to decipher, such as images, words and short videos. Through the images, fans were able to create an alphabet based on the symbols included, which ultimately led to the solutions of later downloads. Behind-the-scenes clips and pictures of the band were also included inside the files, which were titled "USB", followed by the number of the code that unlocked the file (i.e., USB20). Codes 1 to 20 have been found.

The final file download led users to a website that initially allowed them to input their name, mailing address, and Twitter handle. The first 500 individuals to do so received a physical flash drive containing exclusive images, videos, and old demo tracks from 2011. As more responses were entered, the website was changed to show only a message of congratulations.

== Credits and personnel ==
Credits adapted from Tidal.

- Tyler Joseph – vocals, production, synthesizers, recording, songwriting, bass, guitar, keyboards
- Paul Meany – production, synthesizers
- Chris Gehringer – mastering
- Adam Hawkins – mixing
- Josh Dun – drumming, percussion, backing vocals

== Charts ==
=== Weekly charts ===
Weekly chart performance for "Level of Concern"
Chart (2020)	Peak position
Australia (ARIA)	83
Austria (Ö3 Austria Top 40)	42
Belgium (Ultratip Bubbling Under Flanders)	13
Belgium (Ultratip Bubbling Under Wallonia)	2
Canada Hot 100 (Billboard)	53
Canada AC (Billboard)	30
Canada CHR/Top 40 (Billboard)	25
Canada Hot AC (Billboard)	21
Canada Rock (Billboard)	12
CIS Airplay (TopHit)	138
Croatia (HRT)	46
Czech Republic Singles Digital (ČNS IFPI)	27
Estonia (Eesti Tipp-40)	18
Greece International (IFPI)	58
Hungary (Single Top 40)	20
Hungary (Stream Top 40)	18
Ireland (IRMA)	29
Lithuania (AGATA)	27
Mexico Ingles Airplay (Billboard)	2
Netherlands (Dutch Top 40)	24
Netherlands (Single Top 100)	63
New Zealand Hot Singles (RMNZ)	2
Portugal (AFP)	95
Scottish Singles Sales (Official Charts)	48
Slovakia Airplay (ČNS IFPI)	49
Slovakia Singles Digital (ČNS IFPI)	39
Sweden Heatseeker (Sverigetopplistan)	2
Switzerland (Schweizer Hitparade)	85
UK Singles (Official Charts)	42
US Billboard Hot 100	23
US Adult Contemporary (Billboard)	29
US Adult Pop Airplay (Billboard)	11
US Hot Rock & Alternative Songs (Billboard)	1
US Pop Airplay (Billboard)	23
US Rock & Alternative Airplay (Billboard)	1
US Rolling Stone Top 100	12
Venezuela Anglo (Record Report)	7
Venezuela Pop (Record Report)	20

=== Year-end charts ===
Year-end chart performance for "Level of Concern"
Chart (2020)	Position
US Hot Rock & Alternative Songs (Billboard)	7
US Rock Airplay (Billboard)	1

Chart (2021)	Position
US Alternative Airplay (Billboard)	27

== Certifications ==
Certifications and sales for "Level of Concern"
Region	Certification	Certified units/sales
Brazil (Pro-Música Brasil)	Platinum	40,000^{‡}
Canada (Music Canada)	Platinum	80,000^{‡}
New Zealand (RMNZ)	Gold	15,000^{‡}
Poland (ZPAV)	Gold	25,000^{‡}
United Kingdom (BPI)	Silver	200,000^{‡}
United States (RIAA)	Platinum	1,000,000^{‡}
^{‡} Sales+streaming figures based on certification alone.
