= Emotional Roadshow World Tour =

2016–17 concert tour by Twenty One Pilots

- Tour by Twenty One Pilots
- Promotional poster
- Associated album: Blurryface
- Start date: May 31, 2016
- End date: June 25, 2017
- Legs: 5
- No. of shows: 123
- Supporting acts: Mutemath; Chef'Special; Camilo Séptimo; Vinyl Theatre; Bry; Judah & the Lion; Jon Bellion; Safia
- Box office: $24,872,837

Twenty One Pilots concert chronology
- Blurryface Tour (2015–16); Emotional Roadshow World Tour (2016–17); The Bandito Tour (2018–19)

Emotional Roadshow World Tour (stylized as EMØTIØNAL RØADSHØW WØRLD TØUR) was the fifth concert tour by the American musical duo Twenty One Pilots, in support of their fourth studio album Blurryface (2015). The tour began on May 31, 2016, in Cincinnati, and concluded on June 25, 2017, in Columbus. It consisted of 123 shows, making it the longest tour by the duo.

== Background and development ==
The group announced a bigger tour to further promote Blurryface after they conclude the Blurryface Tour. First tour dates were announced on October 26, 2015, and more dates were announced on May 9, 2016.

The first leg took place in North America across the United States, Canada, and Mexico. The leg ran from May 31, 2016, to October 1, 2016. Rock bands Mutemath and Chef'Special served as the opening acts, with the exception of Mexico City where Camilo Séptimo opened, and Mutemath not opening in Milwaukee who was replaced by Vinyl Theatre. The leg also consisted of festival appearances in Edmonton, Calgary, Atlanta, Las Vegas, and Monterrey. In between August 11, 2016, and September 3, 2016, the band performed in Reading and Leeds for the Reading and Leeds Festivals on August 26 and 27, 2016. The second leg took place across Europe. The leg ran from October 22, 2016, to November 17, 2016. Bry served as the opening act, with the exception of Moscow and Saint Petersburg. The third leg took place back in North America across the United States. The leg ran from January 17, 2017, to March 5, 2017. Jon Bellion and Judah & the Lion served as the opening acts. The fourth leg took place across Oceania. The leg ran from March 24, 2017, until April 8, 2017. Safia served as the opening act. The fifth and final leg of the tour took place back in North America. The leg consisted of three festivals and five shows in their hometown of Columbus, Ohio, dubbed Tour De Columbus.

== Set list ==
This set list is representative of the show on February 16, 2017, in Anaheim. It is not representative of all concerts for the duration of the tour.

1. "Heavydirtysoul" (with "Fairly Local" intro)
2. "Migraine"
3. "Hometown"
4. "Message Man" / "Polarize"
5. "Heathens"
6. "House of Gold" / "We Don't Believe What's on TV"
7. "Can't Help Falling in Love (Elvis Presley cover)
8. "Screen" / "The Judge"
9. "Lane Boy"
10. "Ode to Sleep"
11. "Addict With a Pen"
12. "Cancer" (My Chemical Romance cover)
13. "Holding on to You"
14. "Tubthumping" (Chumbawamba cover; with Jon Bellion and Judah & the Lion)
15. "No Diggity" (Blackstreet cover; with Jon Bellion and Judah & the Lion)
16. "Where Is the Love?" (The Black Eyed Peas cover; with Jon Bellion and Judah & the Lion)
17. "Jump Around" (House of Pain cover; with Jon Bellion and Judah & the Lion)
18. "Ride"
19. "Stressed Out"
20. "Guns for Hands"
21. "Tear in My Heart"
22. "Car Radio"

Encore

23. "Goner"
24. "Trees"
Notes
- During the show in Camden, Twenty One Pilots performed and dedicated "Doubt" to Christina Grimmie. Grimmie died on June 10, 2016, of gunshot wounds inflicted in an attack following her concert performance in Orlando.
- During the Charlotte, NC stop of the tour on June 28, 2016 the band performed "Heathens" for the first time and it was added to the setlist after.
- During their performance at the Reading and Leeds Festival on August 26, 2016, as Joseph attempted a crowd surf, he was abruptly attacked by the crowd and pulled under as various possessions of his were stolen and clothes were ripped. Once Joseph made it safely to an elevated platform, he bluntly called out to fellow band mate Josh Dun, "We've gotta be done. That's it." They had to end the set without playing the grand finale "Trees", as they were 10 minutes over the allotted amount of time they were meant to be on-stage.

== Shows ==
List of concerts, showing date, city, country, venue, opening acts, tickets sold, number of available tickets and amount of gross revenue.
Date	City	Country	Venue	Opening acts	Attendance	Revenue
North America – Leg 1
May 31, 2016	Cincinnati	United States	U.S. Bank Arena	Mutemath; Chef'Special	—N/a	—N/a
June 1, 2016	Pittsburgh	United States	Stage AE	Mutemath; Chef'Special	5,200 / 5,200	$205,400
June 3, 2016	Clarkston	United States	DTE Energy Music Theatre	Mutemath; Chef'Special	—N/a	—N/a
June 4, 2016	Grand Rapids	United States	Van Andel Arena	Mutemath; Chef'Special	10,304 / 10,416	$353,140
June 5, 2016	Rosemont	United States	Allstate Arena	Mutemath; Chef'Special	—N/a	—N/a
June 7, 2016	Toronto	Canada	Molson Canadian Amphitheatre	Mutemath; Chef'Special	—N/a	—N/a
June 8, 2016	Cleveland	United States	Wolstein Center	Mutemath; Chef'Special	—N/a	—N/a
June 10, 2016	Columbia	United States	Merriweather Post Pavilion	Mutemath; Chef'Special	—N/a	—N/a
June 11, 2016 (Note: The concert on June 11, 2016, at BB&T Pavilion in Camden is part of Radio 104.5'S 9th birthday celebration.)	Camden	United States	BB&T Pavilion	Mutemath; Chef'Special	23,157 / 25,000	$791,117
June 12, 2016	Portsmouth	United States	Portsmouth Pavilion	Mutemath; Chef'Special	—N/a	—N/a
June 14, 2016	Boston	United States	Agganis Arena	Mutemath; Chef'Special	—N/a	—N/a
June 15, 2016	Boston	United States	Agganis Arena	Mutemath; Chef'Special	—N/a	—N/a
June 17, 2016	Uncasville	United States	Mohegan Sun Arena	Mutemath; Chef'Special	6,229 / 6,312	$308,336
June 18, 2016	Gilford	United States	Bank of New Hampshire Pavilion	Mutemath; Chef'Special	8,320 / 8,320	$333,573
June 19, 2016	Hershey	United States	Hersheypark Stadium	Mutemath; Chef'Special	27,215 / 27,215	$898,126
June 21, 2016	Buffalo	United States	Canalside	Mutemath; Chef'Special	—N/a	—N/a
June 28, 2016	Charlotte	United States	Charlotte Metro Credit; Union Amphitheatre	Mutemath; Chef'Special	—N/a	—N/a
June 29, 2016	Raleigh	United States	Red Hat Amphitheater	Mutemath; Chef'Special	—N/a	—N/a
July 1, 2016	Orlando	United States	Amway Center	Mutemath; Chef'Special	11,653 / 11,653	$420,639
July 2, 2016	Sunrise	United States	BB&T Center	Mutemath; Chef'Special	11,705 / 11,916	$393,775
July 3, 2016	St. Augustine	United States	St. Augustine Amphitheatre	Mutemath; Chef'Special	—N/a	—N/a
July 5, 2016	The Woodlands	United States	Cynthia Woods Mitchell Pavilion	Mutemath; Chef'Special	15,556 / 15,950	$360,149
July 6, 2016	Austin	United States	Austin360 Amphitheater	Mutemath; Chef'Special	12,914 / 13,164	$360,230
July 8, 2016	Allen	United States	Allen Event Center	Mutemath; Chef'Special	—N/a	—N/a
July 9, 2016	Oklahoma City	United States	The Zoo Amphitheatre	Mutemath; Chef'Special	—N/a	—N/a
July 10, 2016	Kansas City	United States	Sprint Center	Mutemath; Chef'Special	12,652 / 17,225	$437,425
July 12, 2016	Morrison	United States	Red Rocks Amphitheatre	Mutemath; Chef'Special	—N/a	—N/a
July 13, 2016	Morrison	United States	Red Rocks Amphitheatre	Mutemath; Chef'Special	—N/a	—N/a
July 15, 2016	Las Vegas	United States	The Joint	Mutemath; Chef'Special	4,317 / 4,317	$204,814
July 16, 2016	Salt Lake City	United States	Vivint Smart Home Arena	Mutemath; Chef'Special	—N/a	—N/a
July 18, 2016	Seattle	United States	WaMu Theater	Mutemath; Chef'Special	—N/a	—N/a
July 19, 2016	Portland	United States	Moda Center	Mutemath; Chef'Special	—N/a	—N/a
July 21, 2016	Berkeley	United States	Hearst Greek Theatre	Mutemath; Chef'Special	17,000 / 17,000	$767,880
July 22, 2016	Berkeley	United States	Hearst Greek Theatre	Mutemath; Chef'Special	17,000 / 17,000	$767,880
July 23, 2016	Inglewood	United States	The Forum	Mutemath; Chef'Special	12,648 / 12,648	$537,060
July 24, 2016	San Diego	United States	Viejas Arena	Mutemath; Chef'Special	—N/a	—N/a
July 26, 2016	Phoenix	United States	Talking Stick Resort Arena	Mutemath; Chef'Special	12,552 / 12,894	$424,747
July 28, 2016	Lincoln	United States	Pinewood Bowl Amphitheater	Mutemath; Chef'Special	—N/a	—N/a
July 29, 2016	Saint Paul	United States	Xcel Energy Center	Mutemath; Chef'Special	13,581 / 14,255	$428,475
July 30, 2016	Milwaukee	United States	BMO Harris Pavilion	Vinyl Theatre; Chef'Special	—N/a	—N/a
July 31, 2016	Indianapolis	United States	Bankers Life Fieldhouse	Mutemath; Chef'Special	11,691 / 12,002	$389,419
August 2, 2016	St. Louis	United States	Scottrade Center	Mutemath; Chef'Special	—N/a	—N/a
August 3, 2016	Rogers	United States	Walmart Arkansas Music Pavilion	Mutemath; Chef'Special	—N/a	—N/a
August 5, 2016	Orange Beach	United States	The Amphitheater at The Wharf	Mutemath; Chef'Special	9,573 / 9,573	$324,178
August 6, 2016	Duluth	United States	Infinite Energy Arena	Mutemath; Chef'Special	9,767 / 9,767	$391,115
August 7, 2016	Nashville	United States	Ascend Amphitheater	Mutemath; Chef'Special	—N/a	—N/a
August 10, 2016	New York City	United States	Madison Square Garden	Mutemath; Chef'Special	24,661 / 24,661	$1,184,446
August 11, 2016	New York City	United States	Madison Square Garden	Mutemath; Chef'Special	24,661 / 24,661	$1,184,446
Europe
August 26, 2016 (Note: The concert on August 26, 2016, at Little John's Farm in Reading is part of Reading and Leeds Festivals.)	Reading	England	Little John's Farm	—N/a	—N/a	—N/a
August 27, 2016 (Note: The concert on August 27, 2016, at Bramham Park in Leeds is part of Reading and Leeds Festivals.)	Leeds	England	Bramham Park	—N/a	—N/a	—N/a
North America – Leg 1
September 3, 2016 (Note: The concert on September 3, 2016, at Borden Park in Edmonton is part of Sonic Boom.)	Edmonton	Canada	Borden Park	—N/a	—N/a	—N/a
September 4, 2016 (Note: The concert on September 4, 2016, at Fort Calgary in Calgary is part of X-Fest.)	Calgary	Canada	Fort Calgary	—N/a	—N/a	—N/a
September 17, 2016 (Note: The concert on September 17, 2016, at Piedmont Park in Atlanta is part of Music Midtown.)	Atlanta	United States	Piedmont Park	—N/a	—N/a	—N/a
September 23, 2016 (Note: The concert on September 23, 2016, at the T-Mobile Arena in Las Vegas is part of iHeartRadio Music Festival.)	Las Vegas	United States	T-Mobile Arena	—N/a	—N/a	—N/a
September 30, 2016	Mexico City	Mexico	Palacio de los Deportes	Camilo Séptimo	20,656 / 21,013	$692,186
October 1, 2016 (Note: The concert on October 1, 2016, at Parque Fundidora in Monterrey is part of Live Out 2016.)	Monterrey	Mexico	Parque Fundidora	—N/a	—N/a	—N/a
Leg 2 – Europe
October 22, 2016	Moscow	Russia	Sokol Music Hall	—N/a	—N/a	—N/a
October 23, 2016	Saint Petersburg	Russia	Ice Palace	—N/a	—N/a	—N/a
October 25, 2016	Helsinki	Finland	Helsinki Ice Hall	Bry	—N/a	—N/a
October 27, 2016	Stockholm	Sweden	Annexet	Bry	—N/a	—N/a
October 29, 2016	Oslo	Norway	Oslo Spektrum	Bry	—N/a	—N/a
October 30, 2016	Frederiksberg	Denmark	Falkonersalen	Bry	—N/a	—N/a
October 31, 2016	Hamburg	Germany	Alsterdorfer Sporthalle	Bry	—N/a	—N/a
November 2, 2016	Berlin	Germany	Max-Schmeling-Halle	Bry	—N/a	—N/a
November 3, 2016	Warsaw	Poland	Torwar Hall	Bry	—N/a	—N/a
November 4, 2016	Prague	Czech Republic	Tipsport Arena	Bry	—N/a	—N/a
November 5, 2016	Vienna	Austria	Wiener Stadthalle	Bry	—N/a	—N/a
November 7, 2016	Milan	Italy	Mediolanum Forum	Bry	—N/a	—N/a
November 8, 2016	Munich	Germany	Zenith Munich	Bry	—N/a	—N/a
November 9, 2016	Düsseldorf	Germany	Mitsubishi Electric Halle	Bry	—N/a	—N/a
November 11, 2016	London	England	Alexandra Palace	Bry	—N/a	—N/a
November 13, 2016	London	England	Alexandra Palace	Bry	—N/a	—N/a
November 15, 2016	Amsterdam	Netherlands	Heineken Music Hall	Bry	—N/a	—N/a
November 16, 2016	Brussels	Belgium	Forest National	Bry	—N/a	—N/a
November 17, 2016	Paris	France	Zénith Paris	Bry	—N/a	—N/a
North America – Leg 3
January 17, 2017	Providence	United States	Dunkin' Donuts Center	Jon Bellion; Judah & the Lion	10,051 / 10,051	$461,773
January 18, 2017	Bridgeport	United States	Webster Bank Arena	Jon Bellion; Judah & the Lion	—N/a	—N/a
January 20, 2017	Brooklyn	United States	Barclays Center	Jon Bellion; Judah & the Lion	12,867 / 13,074	$731,119
January 21, 2017	Newark	United States	Prudential Center	Jon Bellion; Judah & the Lion	12,430 / 12,634	$640,502
January 22, 2017	Charlottesville	United States	John Paul Jones Arena	Jon Bellion; Judah & the Lion	11,838 / 11,838	$570,298
January 24, 2017	Allentown	United States	PPL Center	Jon Bellion; Judah & the Lion	—N/a	—N/a
January 25, 2017	Albany	United States	Times Union Center	Jon Bellion; Judah & the Lion	11,605 / 11,605	$542,642
January 27, 2017	Pittsburgh	United States	PPG Paints Arena	Jon Bellion; Judah & the Lion	12,477 / 12,759	$592,916
January 28, 2017	Chicago	United States	United Center	Jon Bellion; Judah & the Lion	12,906 / 13,350	$698,426
January 29, 2017	Moline	United States	iWireless Center	Jon Bellion; Judah & the Lion	—N/a	—N/a
January 31, 2017	Madison	United States	Veterans Memorial Coliseum	Jon Bellion; Judah & the Lion	—N/a	—N/a
February 1, 2017	Omaha	United States	CenturyLink Center Omaha	Jon Bellion; Judah & the Lion	13,572 / 13,751	$573,104
February 3, 2017	Wichita	United States	Intrust Bank Arena	Jon Bellion; Judah & the Lion	10,640 / 10,779	$510,780
February 4, 2017	Sioux Falls	United States	Denny Sanford Premier Center	Jon Bellion; Judah & the Lion	10,349 / 10,547	$462,688
February 7, 2017	Bozeman	United States	Brick Breeden Fieldhouse	Jon Bellion; Judah & the Lion	—N/a	—N/a
February 8, 2017	Boise	United States	Taco Bell Arena	Jon Bellion; Judah & the Lion	—N/a	—N/a
February 10, 2017	San Jose	United States	SAP Center	Jon Bellion; Judah & the Lion	12,429 / 12,429	$641,318
February 11, 2017	Sacramento	United States	Golden 1 Center	Jon Bellion; Judah & the Lion	12,170 / 12,170	$599,442
February 14, 2017	Fresno	United States	Save Mart Center	Jon Bellion; Judah & the Lion	10,535 / 10,763	$509,781
February 15, 2017	Anaheim	United States	Honda Center	Jon Bellion; Judah & the Lion	23,807 / 23,807	$1,017,603
February 16, 2017	Anaheim	United States	Honda Center	Jon Bellion; Judah & the Lion	23,807 / 23,807	$1,017,603
February 18, 2017	Las Vegas	United States	Mandalay Bay Events Center	Jon Bellion; Judah & the Lion	8,681 / 8,681	$418,029
February 19, 2017	Tucson	United States	Tucson Arena	Jon Bellion; Judah & the Lion	—N/a	—N/a
February 21, 2017	Tulsa	United States	BOK Center	Jon Bellion; Judah & the Lion	11,548 / 11,548	$540,592
February 22, 2017	Dallas	United States	American Airlines Center	Jon Bellion; Judah & the Lion	12,215 / 12,964	$674,626
February 24, 2017	Birmingham	United States	Legacy Arena	Jon Bellion; Judah & the Lion	12,138 / 12,138	$480,554
February 25, 2017	Greensboro	United States	Greensboro Coliseum Complex	Jon Bellion; Judah & the Lion	—N/a	—N/a
February 26, 2017	North Charleston	United States	North Charleston Coliseum	Jon Bellion; Judah & the Lion	8,763 / 8,763	$367,720
February 28, 2017	Tampa	United States	Amalie Arena	Jon Bellion; Judah & the Lion	13,267 / 13,538	$606,731
March 2, 2017	New Orleans	United States	Smoothie King Center	Jon Bellion; Judah & the Lion	12,555 / 12,555	$565,116
March 3, 2017	North Little Rock	United States	Verizon Arena	Jon Bellion; Judah & the Lion	13,793 / 13,793	$587,502
March 4, 2017	Memphis	United States	FedExForum	Jon Bellion; Judah & the Lion	—N/a	—N/a
March 5, 2017	Louisville	United States	KFC Yum! Center	Jon Bellion; Judah & the Lion	—N/a	—N/a
Oceania – Leg 4
March 24, 2017	Wellington	New Zealand	TSB Bank Arena	Safia	—N/a	—N/a
March 25, 2017	Auckland	New Zealand	Vector Arena	Safia	—N/a	—N/a
March 27, 2017	Brisbane	Australia	Brisbane Entertainment Centre	Safia	9,414 / 9,414	$544,068
March 29, 2017	Adelaide	Australia	Adelaide Entertainment Centre	Safia	—N/a	—N/a
March 31, 2017	Melbourne	Australia	Rod Laver Arena	Safia	11,827 / 11,827	$705,843
April 1, 2017	Sydney	Australia	Qudos Bank Arena	Safia	13,878 / 13,878	$793,546
April 8, 2017	Perth	Australia	Perth Arena	Safia	9,091 / 9,335	$535,731
North America – Leg 5
May 19, 2017 (Note: The concert on May 19, 2017, at Gulf Shores Beach in Gulf Shores is part of Hangout Music Festival.)	Gulf Shores	United States	Gulf Shores Beach	—N/a	—N/a	—N/a
May 27, 2017 (Note: The concert on May 27, 2017, at The Gorge Amphitheatre in George is part of Sasquatch! Music Festival.)	George	United States	The Gorge Amphitheatre	—N/a	—N/a	—N/a
June 16, 2017 (Note: The concert on June 16, 2017, at The Woodlands of Dover International Speedway in Dover is part of Firefly Music Festival.)	Dover	United States	The Woodlands of Dover International Speedway	—N/a	—N/a	—N/a
June 20, 2017 (Note: The concerts on June 20, 21, 22, 24 and 25, 2017, in Columbus are part of the Tour De Columbus, a series of hometown shows across the city of Columbus where the duo started.)	Columbus	United States	The Basement	—N/a	284 / 284	$11,218
June 21, 2017	Columbus	United States	Newport Music Hall	—N/a	1,600 / 1,600	$63,200
June 22, 2017	Columbus	United States	Express Live!	Mutemath	5,500 / 5,500	$217,250
June 24, 2017	Columbus	United States	Nationwide Arena	Judah & the Lion; Public	—N/a	—N/a
June 25, 2017	Columbus	United States	Schottenstein Center	MisterWives; Vesperteen	—N/a	—N/a
Total					584,370 / 596,665 (97.9%)	$24,872,837
