= The Bandito Tour =

2018–19 concert tour by Twenty One Pilots

- Tour by Twenty One Pilots
- Promotional poster
- Location: North America; Europe; Oceania; South America
- Associated album: Trench
- Start date: October 17, 2018
- End date: December 13, 2019
- Legs: 5
- No. of shows: 115
- Supporting acts: Awolnation; Max Frost; Drapht; The Regrettes; Saint Motel; Bear Hands; MisterWives

Twenty One Pilots concert chronology
- Emotional Roadshow World Tour (2016–17); The Bandito Tour (2018–19); Takeover Tour (2021–22)

The Bandito Tour (stylized as THE BANDITØ TØUR) was the sixth concert tour by the American musical duo Twenty One Pilots, in support of their fifth studio album Trench (2018). The tour began at the Bridgestone Arena in Nashville, Tennessee on October 16, 2018, and concluded at the Aragon Ballroom in Chicago, Illinois on December 13, 2019. An additional tour date was scheduled for June 24, 2020, in Dublin, Ireland, before it was cancelled due to the COVID-19 pandemic.

== Background and promotion ==
On July 11, 2018, Twenty One Pilots ended their hiatus by releasing two singles, "Jumpsuit" and "Nico and the Niners". The same day both their album, Trench, and its accompanying tour, The Bandito Tour, were announced. It was later revealed that indie rock musician Max Frost and electronic rock band Awolnation would join the band for the first North American leg of the tour. Due to overwhelming demand, the band added a second North American leg to their tour including shows in Canada, Mexico and the band's hometown, Columbus.

The band documented the tour through a series of videos including rehearsals for the tour, as well as clips from the tour itself.

== Concert synopsis ==
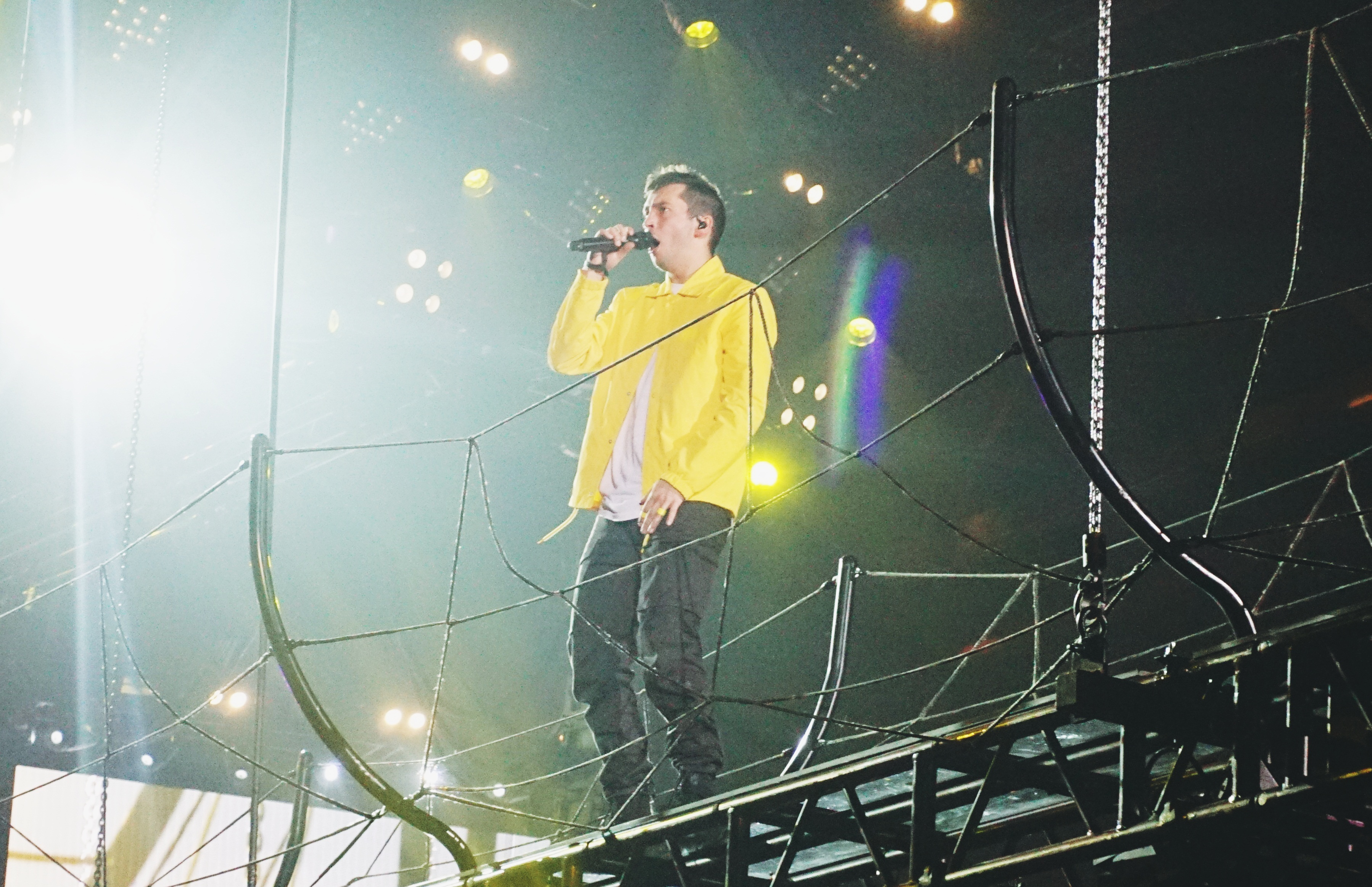
Tyler Joseph performing with Twenty One Pilots during The Bandito Tour in 2019

The Bandito Tour is set in three parts: an opening on the "A-stage" followed by a performance on the "B-stage" and concludes with a second "A-stage" performance and an encore. The show begins with Josh Dun, alone on stage, his face obscured by a yellow bandana and holding a lit torch. As he sits down at the drums, Tyler Joseph rises from below the stage onto a burning car and begins singing "Jumpsuit" followed by "Levitate". During "Fairly Local", Joseph seemingly falls on stage, only to appear a few seconds later in the upper bowl before removing his ski mask. A brief interlude plays over the song "Today's Your Day (Whachagonedu?)" by Fatlip, showing the journey of Tyler's red beanie from many of the music videos supporting Blurryface. The beanie is then dropped down from the ceiling by a wire, and Tyler puts it on. The band then plays their breakthrough single, "Stressed Out", followed by "Heathens", on which Joseph plays a piano intro. The duo then plays "We Don't Believe What's on TV" and "The Judge", Joseph dressed in a floral kimono, before performing "Lane Boy" during which two masked men run on stage to shower the crowd with smoke. Joseph sings and walks across a suspended sky bridge to the b-stage while singing "Nico and the Niners".

Joseph sits down at the piano while Dun runs through the crowd to the b-stage to play "Neon Gravestones" before singing "Bandito" with the crowd. He then walks back on to the bridge singing "Pet Cheetah" and incites the crowd to jump around to the final drop. Dun then returns to the stage and battles himself on the drums, with the other Dun projected onto the screen. During "Holding On to You", Joseph raps the first verse held up by the front row of the crowd before Dun performs his trademark backflip off the piano. Joseph performs a soft piano intro that leads into "Cut My Lip." After singing "Ride", Joseph divides the crowd in half during "My Blood" to sing along to the falsetto chorus of the song. The band then performs "Morph", which is ended with Dun playing a miniature drumset held up by the crowd. Joseph climbs and stands on top of a narrow scaffolding tower during "Car Radio", before leaving the stage. They return for the encore, performing "Chlorine" while rising into the air on platforms. They then perform the final track off the tour's associated album "Leave the City" before singing the show's final song "Trees", as is traditional during their shows, and closing the song off on top of the audience playing drums as yellow confetti flies through the air.

== Critical reception ==
=== First North American leg ===
Gab Ginsberg, writing for Billboard, called the show a "must-see" following the band's performance at Madison Square Garden in New York City, saying "From gravity-defying jumps and flips, to sprinting around and under the arena, Tyler Joseph and Josh Dun continue to prove that they're one of the hardest-working — and most athletic — bands out there." Forbes' Steve Baltin also gave the tour a positive review following the band's performance at The Forum in Inglewood, calling the duo "such a vital band for rock", writing "The show ended, as it has for the past few years, with the moving "Trees," which involves the whole audience singing along. It's a powerful moment that encapsulates everything that makes Twenty One Pilots so special — the connection with the audience, the songs and the passion of everyone involved." Various local reviews were similarly positive.

=== Oceanian leg ===
Mark Beresford of The Music gave the band's show at the RAC Arena in Perth a positive review, saying "this band is a live act who only care about one thing when performing, which is to outshine even the loftiest expectations, and based on the deafening screams from the Perth fans, they've nailed it." Stuff's Melanie Earley was similarly positive and said "Twenty One Pilots have helped to bring hope to an entire room full of people, and within there lies the real magic."

=== European leg ===
Zoe Watson of Belfast Live gave the band's show at the SSE Arena full marks, hailing it as "one of the most exciting and exhilarating shows she had seen at the SSE." Following their show at the SSE Arena in London, Stevie Chick of The Guardian stated that the band delivered "their hook-studded songs and polymorphic pop with a showmanship that would impress even PT Barnum", and gave the show four stars. Elizabeth Aubrey gave the show the same score in her review for the Evening Standard, writing that "while occasionally the aesthetics could detract from the band's lyrical message, the ambition of their striking Bandito Tour impressed and was clearly adored by fans." Anna Smith of Gigwise praised the show, stating that "Tyler's voice exceeds expectations the whole show through, and Josh's seemingly inhuman ability to smash drums for 120 minutes straight allays any doubt that these guys have tricked their way to the top", and added that the band is "A truly phenomenal act deserving of such a committed, devoted fanbase." James Hall of The Daily Telegraph was more critical of the show, giving it three stars, stating that "anything goes in this streaming world" as "an evening that starts with a burning car can actually turn out to be a night of wholesome, fun and unthreatening entertainment."

==== Controversy ====
Following the band's performance at the SSE Arena in Belfast on March 2, 2019, Jim Allister, the leader of the Traditional Unionist Voice, a unionist political party, condemned the show for its "inappropriate" imagery, which included a burning car and the donning of a balaclava, due to the history of the Troubles. He stated that "balaclavas still speak loudly in Northern Ireland of the evils of terrorism, with many still struggling to cope with the devastation and murder wrought by balaclava-clad killers," and added that "we also have to bear in mind the age profile of probably an impressionable audience – that's another reason why this imagery was inappropriate." This prompted numerous fans of Twenty One Pilots to defend the band as "they should not compromise one stage of the tour to cater to Northern Ireland sensitivities."

== Commercial performance ==
According to Pollstar, in 2018, the first North American leg of the tour grossed $10.2 million in total, averaging 12,597 tickets sold and $929,070 per show. From the 6th to the 27th of February 2019, the tour grossed $6,676,182. The tour grossed $23.1 million during the first half of 2019, ranking at 30th place for that time period. The tour ranked at #36 on the Billboard 2019 Top Touring Artists and grossed $49.1 million in total, averaging 726,952 tickets sold. The tour ranked, respectively, at #47 and #55 at the Pollstar Top 2019 Worldwide and North American tours list.

== Set lists ==
North America (2018)

This set list is from the concert on October 30, 2018 at Madison Square Garden. It is not representative of all concerts for the duration of the tour.

A-stage

1. "Jumpsuit"
2. "Levitate"
3. "Fairly Local"
4. "Stressed Out"
5. "Heathens"
6. "We Don't Believe What's on TV"
7. "The Judge"
8. "Lane Boy"
9. "Nico and the Niners"

B-stage

10. "Taxi Cab"
11. "Neon Gravestones"
12. "Bandito"
13. "Pet Cheetah"

A-stage

14. "Holding On to You"
15. "Iris" (Goo Goo Dolls cover)
16. "Hey Jude" (The Beatles cover)
17. "Ride"
18. "My Blood"
19. "Morph"
20. "Car Radio"

Encore

21. "Leave the City"
22. "Trees"
Oceania

This set list is from the concert on December 21, 2018 at Spark Arena. It is not representative of all concerts for the duration of the tour.

1. "Jumpsuit"
2. "Levitate"
3. "Fairly Local"
4. "Today's Your Day (Fatlip cover)" (interlude)
5. "Stressed Out"
6. "Heathens"
7. "We Don't Believe What's on TV"
8. "Can't Help Falling in Love" (Elvis Presley cover)
9. "The Judge"
10. "Lane Boy"
11. "Nico and the Niners"
12. "Taxi Cab"
13. "Neon Gravestones"
14. "Pet Cheetah"
15. "Holding On to You"
16. "Ride"
17. "My Blood"
18. "Morph"
19. "Car Radio"

Encore

20. "Leave the City"
21. "Trees"
Europe

This set list is from the concert on January 30, 2019 at the Palace of Sports. It is not representative of all concerts for the duration of the tour.

A-stage

1. "Jumpsuit"
2. "Levitate"
3. "Fairly Local"
4. "Stressed Out ('Today's Your Day' intro)"
5. "Heathens"
6. "We Don't Believe What's on TV"
7. "The Judge"
8. "Lane Boy"
9. "Nico and the Niners"

B-stage

10. "Taxi Cab"
11. "Neon Gravestones"
12. "Bandito"
13. "Pet Cheetah"

A-stage

14. "Holding On to You"
15. "Cut My Lip"
16. "Ride"
17. "My Blood"
18. "Morph"
19. "Car Radio"

Encore

20. "Chlorine"
21. "Leave the City"
22. "Trees"

== Shows ==
List of concerts, showing date, city, country, venue, opening acts, tickets sold, number of available tickets and amount of gross revenue
Date	City	Country	Venue	Opening acts	Attendance	Revenue
North America
October 16, 2018	Nashville	United States	Bridgestone Arena	Awolnation; Max Frost	13,490 / 13,859	$987,875
October 17, 2018	Chicago	United States	United Center	Awolnation; Max Frost	—N/a	—N/a
October 19, 2018	St. Louis	United States	Enterprise Center	Awolnation; Max Frost	—N/a	—N/a
October 20, 2018	Milwaukee	United States	Fiserv Forum	Awolnation; Max Frost	—N/a	—N/a
October 21, 2018	Saint Paul	United States	Xcel Energy Center	Awolnation; Max Frost	—N/a	—N/a
October 23, 2018	Cleveland	United States	Quicken Loans Arena	Awolnation; Max Frost	—N/a	—N/a
October 24, 2018	Detroit	United States	Little Caesars Arena	Awolnation; Max Frost	—N/a	—N/a
October 26, 2018	Boston	United States	TD Garden	Awolnation; Max Frost	—N/a	—N/a
October 27, 2018	Uniondale	United States	Nassau Coliseum	Awolnation; Max Frost	—N/a	—N/a
October 28, 2018	Philadelphia	United States	Wells Fargo Center	Awolnation; Max Frost	—N/a	—N/a
October 30, 2018	New York City	United States	Madison Square Garden	Awolnation; Max Frost	—N/a	—N/a
October 31, 2018	Washington, D.C.	United States	Capital One Arena	Awolnation; Max Frost	—N/a	—N/a
November 2, 2018	Atlanta	United States	State Farm Arena	Awolnation; Max Frost	—N/a	—N/a
November 3, 2018	Tampa	United States	Amalie Arena	Awolnation; Max Frost	—N/a	—N/a
November 4, 2018	Sunrise	United States	BB&T Center	Awolnation; Max Frost	—N/a	—N/a
November 6, 2018	Houston	United States	Toyota Center	Awolnation; Max Frost	11,503 / 11,503	$825,217
November 7, 2018	Dallas	United States	American Airlines Center	Awolnation; Max Frost	12,487 / 13,168	$845,836
November 9, 2018	Phoenix	United States	Talking Stick Resort Arena	Awolnation; Max Frost	—N/a	—N/a
November 10, 2018	Inglewood	United States	The Forum	Awolnation; Max Frost	14,464 / 14,464	$1,340,387
November 11, 2018	Oakland	United States	Oracle Arena	Awolnation; Max Frost	—N/a	—N/a
November 13, 2018	Salt Lake City	United States	Vivint Smart Home Arena	Awolnation; Max Frost	—N/a	—N/a
November 15, 2018	Portland	United States	Moda Center	Awolnation; Max Frost	—N/a	—N/a
November 16, 2018	Tacoma	United States	Tacoma Dome	Awolnation; Max Frost	19,613 / 19,613	$1,216,541
November 17, 2018	Boise	United States	Taco Bell Arena	Awolnation; Max Frost	—N/a	—N/a
November 19, 2018	Denver	United States	Pepsi Center	Awolnation; Max Frost	—N/a	—N/a
November 20, 2018	Lincoln	United States	Pinnacle Bank Arena	Awolnation; Max Frost	—N/a	—N/a
November 21, 2018	Kansas City	United States	Sprint Center	Awolnation; Max Frost	—N/a	—N/a
Oceania
December 7, 2018	Perth	Australia	RAC Arena	Drapht	—N/a	—N/a
December 10, 2018	Adelaide	Australia	Adelaide Entertainment Centre	Drapht	—N/a	—N/a
December 13, 2018	Melbourne	Australia	Rod Laver Arena	Drapht	—N/a	—N/a
December 16, 2018	Sydney	Australia	Qudos Bank Arena	Drapht	9,722 / 10,362	$784,315
December 18, 2018	Brisbane	Australia	Brisbane Entertainment Centre	Drapht	—N/a	—N/a
December 21, 2018	Auckland	New Zealand	Spark Arena	Drapht	—N/a	—N/a
Europe
January 30, 2019	Kyiv	Ukraine	Palace of Sports	—N/a	—N/a	—N/a
February 2, 2019	Moscow	Russia	VTB Arena	—N/a	—N/a	—N/a
February 4, 2019	Saint Petersburg	Russia	Ice Palace	—N/a	—N/a	—N/a
February 6, 2019	Helsinki	Finland	Hartwall Arena	The Regrettes	—N/a	—N/a
February 8, 2019	Stockholm	Sweden	Avicii Arena	The Regrettes	—N/a	—N/a
February 9, 2019	Oslo	Norway	Telenor Arena	The Regrettes	—N/a	—N/a
February 11, 2019	Copenhagen	Denmark	Royal Arena	The Regrettes	—N/a	—N/a
February 12, 2019	Hamburg	Germany	Barclaycard Arena	The Regrettes	—N/a	—N/a
February 14, 2019	Berlin	Germany	Mercedes-Benz Arena	The Regrettes	—N/a	—N/a
February 15, 2019	Łódź	Poland	Atlas Arena	The Regrettes	—N/a	—N/a
February 16, 2019	Prague	Czech Republic	O_{2} Arena	The Regrettes	—N/a	—N/a
February 17, 2019	Vienna	Austria	Wiener Stadthalle	The Regrettes	—N/a	—N/a
February 21, 2019	Bologna	Italy	Unipol Arena	The Regrettes	—N/a	—N/a
February 23, 2019	Zürich	Switzerland	Hallenstadion	The Regrettes	—N/a	—N/a
February 24, 2019	Stuttgart	Germany	Hanns-Martin-Schleyer-Halle	The Regrettes	—N/a	—N/a
February 25, 2019	Cologne	Germany	Lanxess Arena	The Regrettes	15,026 / 15,026	$943,832
February 27, 2019	Birmingham	England	Resorts World Arena	The Regrettes	—N/a	—N/a
March 1, 2019	Dublin	Ireland	3Arena	The Regrettes	—N/a	—N/a
March 2, 2019	Belfast	Northern Ireland	SSE Arena	The Regrettes	—N/a	—N/a
March 4, 2019	Glasgow	Scotland	The SSE Hydro	The Regrettes	—N/a	—N/a
March 5, 2019	Manchester	England	Manchester Arena	The Regrettes	—N/a	—N/a
March 7, 2019	London	England	Wembley Arena	The Regrettes	31,347 / 31,347	$1,934,480
March 8, 2019	London	England	Wembley Arena	The Regrettes	31,347 / 31,347	$1,934,480
March 9, 2019	London	England	Wembley Arena	The Regrettes	31,347 / 31,347	$1,934,480
March 11, 2019	Paris	France	Accor Hotels Arena	The Regrettes	15,285 / 15,900	$843,400
March 12, 2019	Amsterdam	Netherlands	Ziggo Dome	The Regrettes	—N/a	—N/a
March 13, 2019	Brussels	Belgium	Palais 12	The Regrettes	—N/a	—N/a
March 15, 2019	Bilbao	Spain	Bizkaia Arena	The Regrettes	—N/a	—N/a
March 16, 2019	Madrid	Spain	WiZink Center	The Regrettes	—N/a	—N/a
March 17, 2019	Lisbon	Portugal	Altice Arena	The Regrettes	—N/a	—N/a
North America - Leg 2
May 1, 2019	Monterrey	Mexico	Arena Monterrey	Saint Motel	—N/a	—N/a
May 3, 2019	Mexico City	Mexico	Palacio de los Deportes	Saint Motel	39,083 / 39,083	$2,178,687
May 4, 2019	Mexico City	Mexico	Palacio de los Deportes	Saint Motel	39,083 / 39,083	$2,178,687
May 6, 2019	Guadalajara	Mexico	Arena VFG	Saint Motel	—N/a	—N/a
May 12, 2019	Vancouver	Canada	Rogers Arena	Bear Hands	—N/a	—N/a
May 14, 2019	Calgary	Canada	Scotiabank Saddledome	Bear Hands	—N/a	—N/a
May 15, 2019	Edmonton	Canada	Rogers Place	Bear Hands	—N/a	—N/a
May 17, 2019	Winnipeg	Canada	Bell MTS Place	Bear Hands	—N/a	—N/a
May 20, 2019	London	Canada	Budweiser Gardens	Bear Hands	7,768 / 9,193	$467,288
May 21, 2019	Ottawa	Canada	Canadian Tire Centre	Bear Hands	—N/a	—N/a
May 22, 2019	Montreal	Canada	Bell Centre	Bear Hands	10,961 / 13,700	$689,794
May 28, 2019	Toronto	Canada	Scotiabank Arena	Bear Hands	—N/a	—N/a
May 31, 2019	Grand Rapids	United States	Van Andel Arena	Bear Hands	—N/a	—N/a
June 1, 2019	Buffalo	United States	KeyBank Center	Bear Hands	—N/a	—N/a
June 4, 2019	Brooklyn	United States	Barclays Center	Bear Hands	11,133 / 11,133	$996,938
June 5, 2019	Newark	United States	Prudential Center	Bear Hands	—N/a	—N/a
June 7, 2019	Pittsburgh	United States	PPG Paints Arena	Bear Hands	—N/a	—N/a
June 8, 2019	Atlantic City	United States	Boardwalk Hall	Bear Hands	12,783 / 13,297	$852,580
June 9, 2019	Charlottesville	United States	John Paul Jones Arena	Bear Hands	—N/a	—N/a
June 11, 2019	Raleigh	United States	PNC Arena	Bear Hands	—N/a	—N/a
June 12, 2019	Charlotte	United States	Spectrum Center	Bear Hands	—N/a	—N/a
June 14, 2019	Jacksonville	United States	Jacksonville Veterans Memorial Arena	Bear Hands	—N/a	—N/a
June 15, 2019	Miami	United States	American Airlines Arena	Bear Hands	—N/a	—N/a
June 16, 2019	Orlando	United States	Amway Center	Bear Hands	12,881 / 13,229	$847,997
June 18, 2019	Birmingham	United States	Legacy Arena	Bear Hands	—N/a	—N/a
June 19, 2019	New Orleans	United States	Smoothie King Center	Bear Hands	10,864 / 10,864	$733,391
June 21, 2019	Houston	United States	Toyota Center	Bear Hands	—N/a	—N/a
June 22, 2019	San Antonio	United States	AT&T Center	Bear Hands	—N/a	—N/a
June 23, 2019	Austin	United States	Frank Erwin Center	Bear Hands	11,080 / 11,080	$825,322
June 25, 2019	Oklahoma City	United States	Chesapeake Energy Arena	Bear Hands	—N/a	—N/a
June 26, 2019	Memphis	United States	FedExForum	Bear Hands	—N/a	—N/a
June 28, 2019	Indianapolis	United States	Bankers Life Fieldhouse	Bear Hands	—N/a	—N/a
June 29, 2019	Columbus	United States	Nationwide Arena	Bear Hands	—N/a	—N/a
June 30, 2019	Columbus	United States	Nationwide Arena	Bear Hands	—N/a	—N/a
North America - Leg 3
October 9, 2019	Tampa	United States	Amalie Arena	MisterWives	—N/a	—N/a
October 11, 2019	Greenville	United States	Bon Secours Wellness Arena	MisterWives	—N/a	—N/a
October 12, 2019	Atlanta	United States	State Farm Arena	MisterWives	—N/a	—N/a
October 15, 2019	Baltimore	United States	Royal Farms Arena	MisterWives	—N/a	—N/a
October 17, 2019	Uncasville	United States	Mohegan Sun Arena	MisterWives	—N/a	—N/a
October 18, 2019	University Park	United States	Bryce Jordan Center	MisterWives	—N/a	—N/a
October 20, 2019	Philadelphia	United States	Wells Fargo Center	MisterWives	—N/a	—N/a
October 22, 2019	Cincinnati	United States	U.S. Bank Arena	MisterWives	—N/a	—N/a
October 24 2019	Minneapolis	United States	Target Center	MisterWives	—N/a	—N/a
October 25, 2019	Des Moines	United States	Wells Fargo Arena	MisterWives	—N/a	—N/a
October 27, 2019	Denver	United States	Pepsi Center	MisterWives	—N/a	—N/a
October 30, 2019	Las Vegas	United States	MGM Grand Garden Arena	MisterWives	—N/a	—N/a
November 1, 2019	Los Angeles	United States	Staples Center	MisterWives	13,688 / 13,688	$1,062,699
November 2, 2019	Anaheim	United States	Honda Center	MisterWives	—N/a	—N/a
November 3, 2019	Sacramento	United States	Golden 1 Center	MisterWives	12,509 / 12,509	$988,020
November 4, 2019 (Note: The concert on November 4, 2019 was originally scheduled to take place on October 28, 2019, but were rescheduled due to inclement weather.)	Salt Lake City	United States	Vivint Smart Home Arena	MisterWives	9,756 / 9,756	$702,482
November 5, 2019	San Diego	United States	Pechanga Arena	MisterWives	—N/a	—N/a
November 8, 2019	Fort Worth	United States	Dickies Arena	MisterWives	12,435 / 12,658	$891,443
November 9, 2019	Tulsa	United States	BOK Center	MisterWives	12,220 / 12,220	$783,874

=== Festivals and other concerts ===
List of concerts/festivals, showing date, city, country and venue
Date	Festival	City	Country	Venue	Comments
North America
January 19, 2019	iHeartRadio ALTer EGO	Inglewood	United States	The Forum	Openers
South America
March 29, 2019	Lollapalooza Argentina	Buenos Aires	Argentina	Hipodromo de San Isidro	Headliners
March 30, 2019	Lollapalooza Chile	Santiago	Chile	O'Higgins Park	Headliners
April 2, 2019	Asunciónico	Asunción	Paraguay	Espacio Idesa	Headliners
April 5, 2019	Estéreo Picnic Festival	Bogotá	Colombia	Briceño 18 Golf Course	Headliners
April 7, 2019	Lollapalooza Brasil	São Paulo	Brazil	Autódromo José Carlos Pace	Headliners
North America
May 24, 2019	Boston Calling Music Festival	Boston	United States	Harvard Athletics Complex	Headliners
Europe
May 26, 2019	Radio 1's Big Weekend	Middlesbrough	England	Stewart Park	Headliners of the New Music Stage
North America
July 5, 2019	MLB All-Star Concerts	Cleveland	United States	Huntington Convention Center of Cleveland	Headliners (free concert)
July 7, 2019	Quebec City Summer Festival	Quebec City	Canada	Plains of Abraham	Headliners
Europe
July 17, 2019	Gurtenfestival	Bern	Switzerland	Gurtenfestival	Headliners
July 19, 2019	Festival de Nîmes	Nîmes	France	Arènes de Nînes	Headliners
July 20, 2019	Lollapalooza Paris	Paris	France	Longchamp Racecourse	Headliners
July 23, 2019	Paléo Festival	Nyon	Switzerland	Plaine de l'Asse	Headliners
North America
August 3, 2019	Lollapalooza Chicago	Chicago	United States	Grant Park	Headliners
August 9, 2019	Outside Lands Music and Arts Festival	San Francisco	United States	Golden Gate Park	Headliners
Europe
August 13, 2019	Sziget Festival	Budapest	Hungary	Óbudai-sziget	Headliners
August 15, 2019	FM4 Frequency Festival	Sankt Pölten	Austria	Green Park	Headliners
August 17, 2019	Lowlands	Biddinghuizen	Netherlands	Walibi Holland Event Center	Headliners
August 18, 2019	pukkelpop	Hasselt	Belgium	Pukkelpop	Headliners
August 22, 2019	Le Cabaret Vert	Charleville-Mézières	France	Square Bayard	Headliners
August 24, 2019	Reading and Leeds Festivals	Reading	England	Richfield Avenue Festival Site	Co-headlining Reading
August 25, 2019	Reading and Leeds Festivals	Wetherby	England	Bramham Park	Co-headlining Leeds
August 31, 2019	Milano Rocks 2019	Milan	Italy	Area EXPO	Headliners
September 7, 2019	Lollapalooza Berlin	Berlin	Germany	The Berlin Olympic Stadium	Headliners
North America
December 7, 2019	ALT 105.3 Not So Silent Night	San Jose	United States	SAP Center	Headliners
December 8, 2019	KROQ Almost Acoustic Christmas	Anaheim	United States	Honda Center	Headliners
December 13, 2019	101WKQX's The Nights We Stole Christmas	Chicago	United States	Aragon Ballroom	Headliners

=== Cancelled shows ===
List of cancelled concerts, showing date, city, country, venue and reason for cancellation.
Date	City	Country	Venue	Reason
May 29, 2019	Toronto	Canada	Scotiabank Arena	Toronto Raptors advancing to the 2019 NBA Finals
June 24, 2020	Dublin	Ireland	RDS Arena	COVID-19 pandemic

== Accolades ==
Award	Year (Note: Indicates the year of ceremony. Each year is linked to the article about the awards held that year, wherever possible.)	Category	Result	Ref.
Pollstar Awards	2020	Best Rock Tour	Nominated	
