= Goner (song) =

Promotional single by Twenty One Pilots

from the album Blurryface
- Released: May 18, 2015
- Recorded: 2014
- Length: 3:57
- Label: Fueled by Ramen
- Songwriter: Tyler Joseph
- Producers: Ricky Reed; Tyler Joseph

Twenty One Pilots singles chronology
"Lane Boy" (2015)	"Goner" (2015)	"Ride" (2016)

Music video
- "Goner" on YouTube

"Goner" is a song by the American musical duo Twenty One Pilots, sequenced as the last song from their 2015 album Blurryface. It was released as a promotional single the following day of the album.

== Background ==
"Goner" is the oldest song on Blurryface, according to Tyler Joseph.

== Music video ==
In 2012, a music video for an early version of "Goner" was uploaded to Twenty One Pilots' official YouTube channel with the description "We did this last night. It's a new song we are working on". The music video, directed by longtime collaborator Mark C. Eshleman, consists almost entirely of Tyler Joseph playing an accordion.

== Reception ==
When ranking the 20 best Twenty One Pilots songs, Kerrang! critic Sam Law ranked it number 12, stating that it "finds Tyler on desolate, defeated form, declaring 'I'm a goner' and pleading for someone to 'catch my breath'." commenting that the drumbeat "feels less like salvation than the final topple over the edge."

== Covers ==
The British-American post-hardcore band As It Is covered "Goner" in 2025.

== Charts ==
=== Weekly charts ===
Chart (2015–16)	Peak position
US Hot Rock & Alternative Songs (Billboard)	31

=== Year-end charts ===
Chart (2016)	Position
US Hot Rock Songs (Billboard)	79

== Certifications and sales ==
Region	Certification	Certified units/sales
Poland (ZPAV)	Gold	10,000^{‡}
United States (RIAA)	Platinum	1,000,000^{‡}
^{‡} Sales+streaming figures based on certification alone.
