= Blurryface =

Studio album by Twenty One Pilots
- Released: May 17, 2015
- Recorded: 2014–2015
- Studios: Serenity West Recording (Hollywood, Los Angeles); Epic Recording Studios (Hollywood, Los Angeles); Can Am Recording (Tarzana, California); Sonic Lounge Studios (Grove City, Ohio); Livingston Studios (London, UK); Werewolf Heart Recording (Los Angeles, California)
- Genres: Alternative hip-hop; alternative rock; electropop; indie pop; reggae
- Length: 52:23
- Label: Fueled by Ramen
- Producers: Mike Crossey; Mike Elizondo; Ricky Reed; Tim Anderson; Tyler Joseph

Twenty One Pilots chronology
Vessel (2013)	Blurryface (2015)	Trench (2018)

Singles from Blurryface
- 1. "Fairly Local" Released: March 17, 2015; 2. "Tear in My Heart" Released: April 6, 2015; 3. "Stressed Out" Released: April 28, 2015; 4. "Lane Boy" Released: May 4, 2015; 5. "Ride" Released: April 12, 2016; 6. "Heavydirtysoul" Released: December 9, 2016

Blurryface is the fourth studio album by the American musical duo Twenty One Pilots. It was released on May 17, 2015, through Fueled by Ramen. Lyrically, the album incorporates themes of mental health, insecurity, doubt, and religion. It contains the hit singles "Stressed Out" and "Ride", both of which reached the top-five on the US Billboard Hot 100.

Blurryface was well received by critics, who complimented its themes and musical diversity. It is considered to be the band's breakthrough album, becoming their first release to reach number one on the Billboard 200. The album sold over 1.5 million copies in the United States as of April 2017. In 2018, Blurryface became the first album in the digital era to have every track receive at least a gold certification from the Recording Industry Association of America. On May 15, 2019, it reached the milestone of being on the Billboard 200 chart for four consecutive years, never leaving the chart up until that point. It is also one of the most-streamed albums of all time.

== Background and recording ==
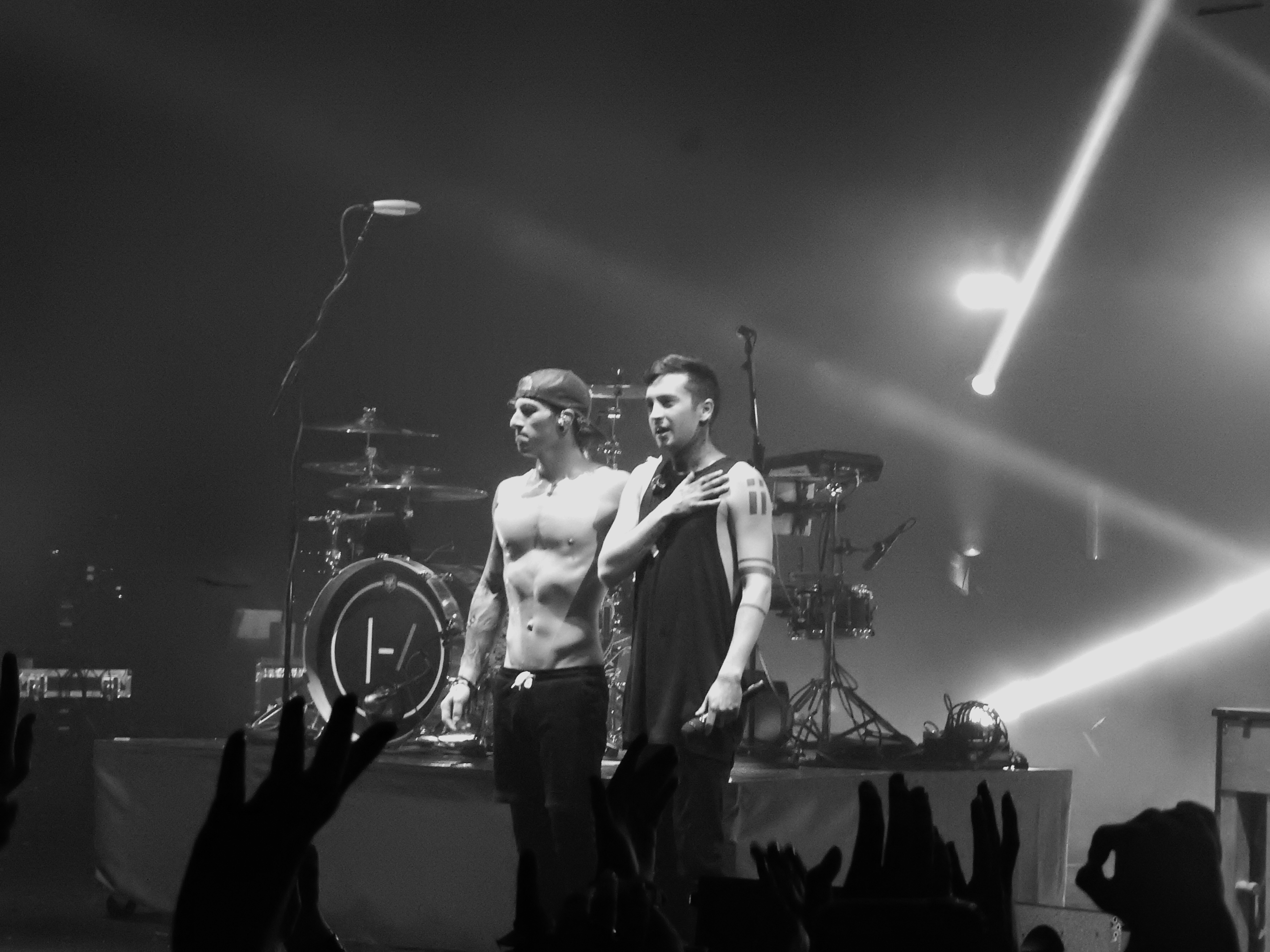
Twenty One Pilots at Brixton Academy, London in 2016

Following the release of their third studio album Vessel, the band toured extensively in support of the album worldwide. While on tour the band had a portable recording studio that allowed them to lay down ideas.

"Heavydirtysoul", "Fairly Local", "Tear in My Heart", "Lane Boy" and "Doubt" were recorded with producer Ricky Reed at Serenity West Recording in Hollywood, California. "Stressed Out", "Polarize", "Hometown" and "Not Today" were recorded with producer Mike Elizondo at Can Am in Tarzana, California. "Ride" was recorded with Reed at Sonic Lounge Studios in Grove City, Ohio. "The Judge" was recorded with producer Mike Crossey at Livingston Studios in London. "We Don't Believe What's on TV" and "Goner" were recorded with Reed at Paramount Recording Studios in Hollywood, California. "Message Man" was recorded with Tim Anderson at Werewolf Heart in Los Angeles, California. The album was mixed by Neal Avron, with assistance from Scott Skrzynski, at The Casita in Hollywood, California. The album was mastered by Chris Gehringer at Sterling Sound in New York City.

== Title and artwork ==
Typeface logo of Blurryface, which features a horizontal line overlapping it

The album is named after a character the band created called Blurryface. According to Joseph, he "represents all the things that I as an individual, but also everyone around, are insecure about." Joseph wears black paint on his hands and neck during his live shows and music videos for the album, to represent Blurryface, saying: "Very dramatic, I know, but it helps me get into that character."

Art direction and design was done by Brandon Rike, Mark Eshleman (of Reel Bear Media), and Virgilio Tzaj. Rob Gold was the art manager, while Josh Skubel was in charge of packaging production. Jabari Jacobs provided photography. On his blog, Rike mentions the different feel of the artwork compared to that of Vessel and how the red on Blurryface is "the color of passion, violence, and anger", although the band is famous for their content being open to interpretation.

== Release ==
On March 17, 2015, the band announced the album's title, track listing and release date. The band's fans crashed their website attempting to pre-order the album. The lead single "Fairly Local" was released on the same day, accompanied by a music video which premiered on the official Fueled by Ramen YouTube channel. On February 3, 2017, the band released the music video for "Heavydirtysoul", which was uploaded as audio only in 2015, and released as a single on December 9, 2016.

On April 6, the band released the second single of the album, "Tear in My Heart", with an official music video released through YouTube. "Tear in My Heart" was released to radio on April 14, 2015. The third single, "Stressed Out", was released on April 28 alongside a music video. On May 4, 2015, the band posted a YouTube video streaming the audio of the album's sixth track, "Lane Boy", and released "Ride" seven days later through the same media; both were also singles, being released on May 4 and 12, respectively. Between May 11 and 14, the band toured the UK. The music video for "Ride" was released on May 14.

On May 19, 2015, the duo performed at the iHeartRadio Theater LA in Burbank, CA, to celebrate the album's release. The concert was live streamed on iHeartRadio's website.

== Composition ==
Blurryface is primarily an alternative hip-hop, alternative rock, electropop, indie pop, and reggae album with influences and elements of hip hop, rock, pop, dub, industrial, drum and bass, indie rock, dubstep, pop-punk, EDM, and jungle.

== Critical reception ==
Professional ratings
Aggregate scores
Source	Rating
Metacritic	80/100
Review scores
Source	Rating
All Things Loud	8.5/10
AllMusic	4/5 stars
Alternative Press	4.5/5 stars
The Austin Chronicle	3/5 stars
Billboard	3/5 stars
Cleveland.com	B
Kerrang!	4/5
Rolling Stone Australia	3/5 stars
Spectrum Culture	2.75/5
Sputnikmusic	3.5/5

According to the review aggregator Metacritic, Blurryface received "generally favorable reviews" based on a weighted average score of 80 out of 100 from 5 critic scores. Garrett Kamps of Billboard hailed the album as a "hot mess (in a good way)", but gave it a mixed review, saying that Blurryface "doesn't quite reach the heights of Vessel".

Sputnikmusic and Alternative Press gave Blurryface favorable reviews, with the latter being the more positive. Their critic, Jason Pettigrew, described the album as "wonderful" and hailed the band's mix of genres in their songs, highlighting "Ride", "Polarize", "Message Man", "Tear in My Heart", "We Don't Believe What's on TV", "Goner" and "Lane Boy" in his review.

=== Accolades ===
The album was ranked at number one in Alternative Press's "10 Essential Records of 2015" list. Jason Pettigrew of Alternative Press wrote that the band combined "hip-hop vistas, tinges of reggae, everyman pop, furious electronic urgency and bellicose sadness into an impossibly cohesive record". The album was included at number 2 on Rock Sound's top 50 releases of 2015 list. Blurryface won the category "Album Of The Year" at the 2016 Alternative Press Music Awards. The album also won the category of "Top Rock Album" at the Billboard Music Awards.

== Commercial performance ==
Blurryface debuted at number 1 on the Billboard 200, earning 147,000 album-equivalent units (134,000 pure album sales) in the United States in its first week, making it Twenty One Pilots' highest-charting album, tied with their eighth album Breach (2025), and marking the band's highest opening week in the US until Trench (2018). The group also made their first appearance on the UK top 40 with Blurryface debuting at number 14 and later peaking at number 5 in September 2016, becoming their first top 10 on the UK albums charts. By November 2015, the album sold 500,000 copies worldwide. The following month, it was announced the album's US sales was over 505,000 copies. By January 2016, the album had sold 592,000 copies in the US. Two months later, the album's US sales had risen to 753,000 copies. By the end of March, the album's US sales stood at 792,000. By mid-June, the album had sold 924,000 copies, and over 1 million by late July. By the end of the year, the album had sold over 1.2 million copies in the US. It was the eighth best-selling album of 2016 with over 1.5 million copies sold worldwide that year, according to the International Federation of the Phonographic Industry. As of April 2017, it has sold over 1.5 million copies domestically in the US. The album has been certified gold in Canada and triple platinum in the US. As of October 2018, the album earned 3.74 million equivalent album units, of which 1.7 million are in traditional album sales in the United States. In 2018, the album became the first non-compilation project to have every song certified gold by the Recording Industry Association of America.

As of October 2018, the album has sold 394,727 copies in the United Kingdom and 6.5 million copies worldwide.

In January 2025, it was revealed that the album lands at #40 on Billboard's "Top Billboard 200 Albums of the 21st Century" list.

In April 2025, an unreleased demo of "Doubt", the album's eighth track, gained popularity on social media platform TikTok. After noticing that it went viral, the group released the demo on streaming platforms and added it to the setlist of the Clancy World Tour.

== Tours ==
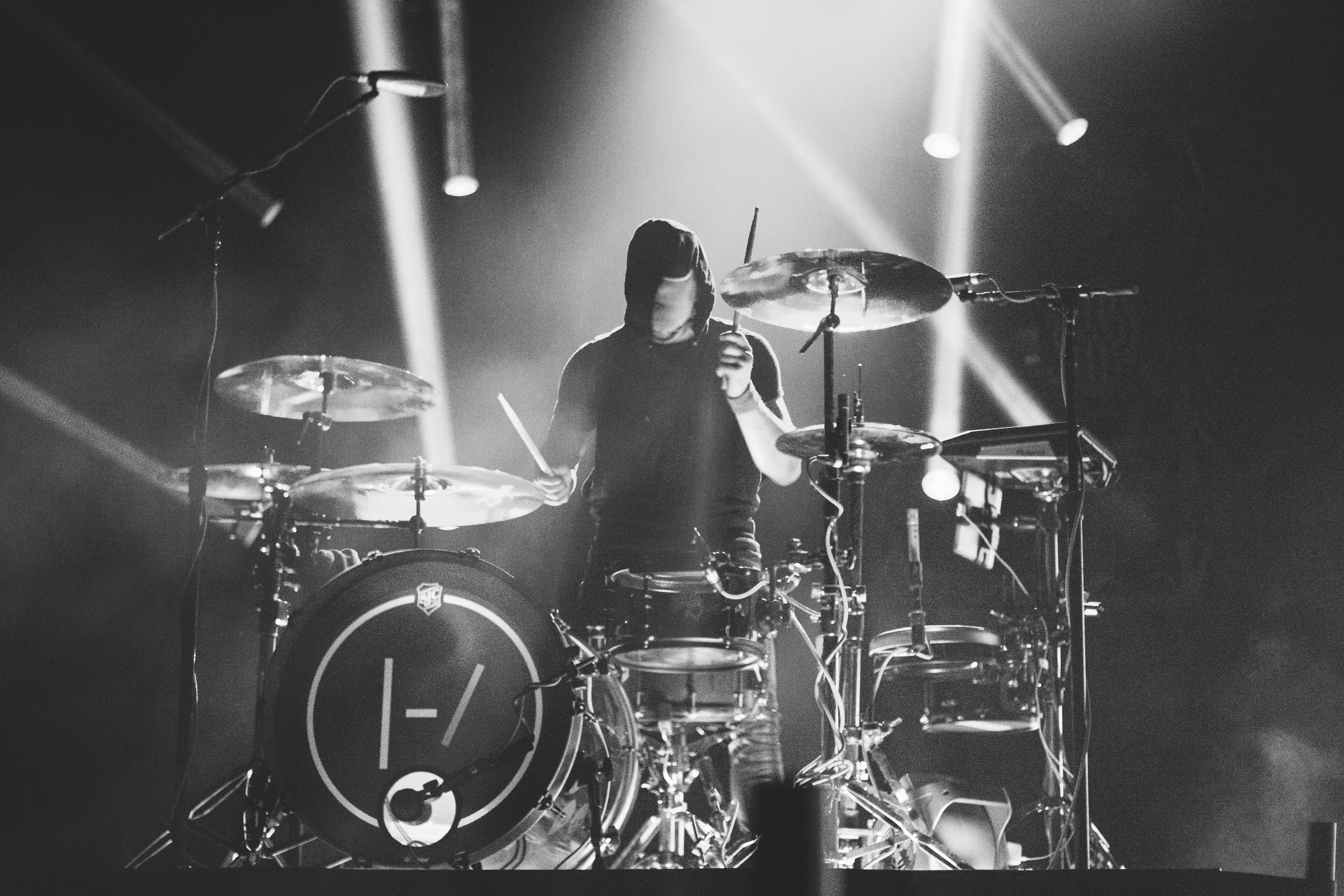
Drummer Josh Dun performing in his signature Blurryface-era outfit in 2016, specifically used during the Blurryface Tour and Emotional Roadshow World Tour.

Twenty One Pilots had their first international tour supporting Blurryface in 2015, titled Blurryface Tour, which consisted of 113 shows worldwide. The tour began on May 11, 2015, in Glasgow, Scotland, and concluded on May 7, 2016, in Bunbury, Australia. Echosmith and Finish Ticket opened for the North American leg of the tour, while South African Jeremy Loops and Canadian Coleman Hell opened for the European and Canadian shows, respectively. Two shows on the tour were recorded at Fox Oakland Theatre and later released as a television special and limited edition vinyl titled Blurryface Live.

Twenty One Pilots began the Emotional Roadshow World Tour in 2016, which also focused mainly on the Blurryface album and character. On October 26, 2015, the tour was announced with North American dates starting in Cincinnati, Ohio, going through New York City, New York. On May 9, 2016, more tour dates were announced, including a second North American leg and dates in Europe and Oceania. Consisting of 123 shows, the tour began on May 31, 2016, in Cincinnati, and concluded on June 25, 2017, in Columbus, Ohio. In total, the band performed 236 shows in support of the album.

== Track listing ==
All tracks are written and co-produced by Tyler Joseph.

Blurryface track listing
No.	Title	Producer	Length
1.	"Heavydirtysoul"	Ricky Reed	3:55
2.	"Stressed Out"	Mike Elizondo	3:22
3.	"Ride"	Reed	3:35
4.	"Fairly Local"	Reed	3:27
5.	"Tear in My Heart"	Reed	3:08
6.	"Lane Boy"	Reed	4:13
7.	"The Judge"	Mike Crossey	4:58
8.	"Doubt"	Reed	3:11
9.	"Polarize"	Elizondo	3:47
10.	"We Don't Believe What's on TV"	Reed	2:57
11.	"Message Man"	Tim Anderson	4:00
12.	"Hometown"	Elizondo	3:55
13.	"Not Today"	Elizondo	3:58
14.	"Goner"	Reed	3:57
Total length:			52:23

Japanese edition bonus tracks
No.	Title	Producer	Length
15.	"Guns for Hands"	Greg Wells	4:30
16.	"Lovely"	Wells	4:18
Total length:			57:19

Limited edition CD bonus track
No.	Title	Producer	Length
1.	"Heathens"	Elizondo	3:15
Total length:			55:39

== Personnel ==
All credits are adapted from the album's liner notes.

Twenty One Pilots

- Tyler Joseph – lead & backing vocals (all tracks), programming (1–6, 8–9, 12), piano (tracks 1, 5–7, 12–14), keyboards (tracks 2, 5, 9, 12), organs (track 3), ukulele (tracks 7 and 10), Hammond organ (track 7), synths (track 7), gang vocals (track 7), guitar (track 5), synth bass (track 9)
- Josh Dun – drums (tracks 1–7, 10, 12–14), electronic drums (tracks 4, 6, 8, 9, 11), percussion (track 7), backing vocals (tracks 5, 7, 13)

Additional musicians

- Ricky Reed – programming (tracks 1, 3–6, 8 and 14), additional vocals (tracks 1 and 8), bass (tracks 3–6, 10 and 14)
- Mike Elizondo – upright bass (track 2), programming (tracks 2, 12 and 13), keyboards (tracks 2, 9, 12 and 13), bass (tracks 9, 12 and 13), synth bass (tracks 9 and 12), guitar (tracks 12 and 13), Hammond B3 (track 13), vocals (track 13)
- Mike Crossey – programming, bass, synths and gang vocals (track 7)
- Jonathan Gilmore – gang vocals (track 7)
- Tim Anderson – synths and programming (track 11)
- Danny T. Levin – trumpet, trombone and euphonium (track 13)
- David Moyer – tenor sax, alto sax, baritone sax and flute (track 13)
- LunchMoney Lewis – additional vocals (track 8)

Additional personnel

- Brandon Rike – art direction, design
- Reel Bear Media – art direction, design
- Virgilio Tzaj – art direction, design
- Jabari Jacobs – photography
- Rob Gold – art management
- Josh Skubel – packaging production

Production

- Tyler Joseph – executive production, co-production
- Chris Woltman – executive production
- Ricky Reed – executive production, production (tracks 1, 3–6, 8, 10 and 14)
- Mike Elizondo – production (tracks 2, 9, 12 and 13)
- Mike Crossey – production (track 7)
- Tim Anderson – production (track 11)
- Neal Avron – mixing
- Chris Gehringer – mastering
- Drew Kapner – engineering (tracks 1, 3–6, 8, 10 and 14)
- Adam Hawkins – engineering (tracks 2, 9, 12 and 13)
- Joe Viers – engineering (track 3)
- Jonathan Gilmore – engineering (track 7)
- Chris Spilfogel – engineering (track 11)
- Scott Skrzynski – assistance
- Michael Peterson – assistance (tracks 1, 4, 6 and 8)
- Brent Arrowood – assistance (tracks 2, 9, 12 and 13)
- Alex Gruszecki – assistance (tracks 3–5)
- Victor Luevanos – assistance (tracks 10 and 14)
- Seth Perez – assistance (track 11)

== Charts ==
=== Weekly charts ===
Weekly chart performance for Blurryface
Chart (2015–2020)	Peak position
Australian Albums (ARIA)	7
Austrian Albums (Ö3 Austria)	12
Belgian Albums (Ultratop Flanders)	17
Belgian Albums (Ultratop Wallonia)	19
Canadian Albums (Billboard)	4
Danish Albums (Hitlisten)	9
Dutch Albums (Album Top 100)	18
Finnish Albums (Suomen virallinen lista)	5
French Albums (SNEP)	13
German Albums (Offizielle Top 100)	27
Greek Albums (IFPI)	18
Hungarian Albums (MAHASZ)	16
Irish Albums (IRMA)	7
Italian Albums (FIMI)	13
Japanese Albums (Oricon)	61
Latvian Albums (LaIPA)	50
Mexican Albums (Top 100 Mexico)	2
New Zealand Albums (RMNZ)	2
Norwegian Albums (VG-lista)	5
Polish Albums (ZPAV)	15
Portuguese Albums (AFP)	13
Scottish Albums (Official Charts)	8
South Korean Albums (Circle)	77
Spanish Albums (Promusicae)	4
Swedish Albums (Sverigetopplistan)	9
Swiss Albums (Schweizer Hitparade)	22
UK Albums (Official Charts)	5
US Billboard 200	1
US Top Rock Albums (Billboard)	1

=== Year-end charts ===
Year-end chart performance for Blurryface
Chart (2015)	Position
US Billboard 200	31
US Digital Albums (Billboard)	19
US Top Rock Albums (Billboard)	7

Year-end chart performance for Blurryface
Chart (2016)	Position
Australian Albums (ARIA)	23
Austrian Albums (Ö3 Austria)	34
Belgian Albums (Ultratop Flanders)	73
Belgian Albums (Ultratop Wallonia)	67
Canadian Albums (Billboard)	4
Danish Albums (Hitlisten)	14
Dutch Albums (Album Top 100)	31
French Albums (SNEP)	24
German Albums (Offizielle Top 100)	44
Icelandic Albums (Plötutíóindi)	58
Italian Albums (FIMI)	63
Mexican Albums (AMPROFON)	41
New Zealand Albums (RMNZ)	9
Polish Albums (ZPAV)	42
Spanish Albums (PROMUSICAE)	57
Swedish Albums (Sverigetopplistan)	12
Swiss Albums (Schweizer Hitparade)	46
UK Albums (OCC)	27
US Billboard 200	6
US Top Rock Albums (Billboard)	1

Year-end chart performance for Blurryface
Chart (2017)	Position
Australian Albums (ARIA)	97
Belgian Albums (Ultratop Flanders)	106
Belgian Albums (Ultratop Wallonia)	108
Canadian Albums (Billboard)	29
Danish Albums (Hitlisten)	92
Dutch Albums (Album Top 100)	74
Italian Albums (FIMI)	86
Mexican Albums (AMPROFON)	60
New Zealand Albums (RMNZ)	25
Swedish Albums (Sverigetopplistan)	75
UK Albums (OCC)	67
US Billboard 200	17
US Top Rock Albums (Billboard)	3

Year-end chart performance for Blurryface
Chart (2018)	Position
Belgian Albums (Ultratop Flanders)	151
US Billboard 200	77
US Top Rock Albums (Billboard)	6

Year-end chart performance for Blurryface
Chart (2019)	Position
Mexican Albums (AMPROFON)	80
US Billboard 200	117
US Top Rock Albums (Billboard)	19

Year-end chart performance for Blurryface
Chart (2020)	Position
US Billboard 200	150
US Top Rock Albums (Billboard)	16

Year-end chart performance for Blurryface
Chart (2021)	Position
US Billboard 200	161
US Top Rock Albums (Billboard)	23

=== Decade-end charts ===
Decade-end chart performance for Blurryface
Chart (2010–2019)	Position
US Billboard 200	12
US Top Rock Albums (Billboard)	1

== Certifications ==
Certifications for Blurryface
Region	Certification	Certified units/sales
Australia (ARIA)	Platinum	70,000^{‡}
Austria (IFPI Austria)	2× Platinum	30,000^{*}
Brazil (Pro-Música Brasil)	3× Platinum	120,000^{‡}
Canada (Music Canada)	6× Platinum	480,000^{‡}
Denmark (IFPI Danmark)	2× Platinum	40,000^{‡}
Germany (BVMI)	Platinum	200,000^{‡}
Italy (FIMI)	2× Platinum	100,000^{‡}
Mexico (AMPROFON)	Platinum+Gold	90,000^{‡}
Netherlands (NVPI)	Platinum	37,200^{‡}
New Zealand (RMNZ)	5× Platinum	75,000^{‡}
Norway (IFPI Norway)	Gold	15,000^{‡}
Poland (ZPAV)	3× Platinum	60,000^{‡}
Singapore (RIAS)	Gold	5,000^{*}
Sweden (GLF)	Gold	20,000^{‡}
Switzerland (IFPI Switzerland)	Platinum	20,000^{‡}
United Kingdom (BPI)	2× Platinum	600,000^{‡}
United States (RIAA)	6× Platinum	6,000,000
^{*} Sales figures based on certification alone.^{‡} Sales+streaming figures based on certification alone.

== Release history ==
Release history for Blurryface
Country	Date
Australia	May 15, 2015
Germany	May 15, 2015
Japan	May 15, 2015
Ireland	May 15, 2015
Netherlands	May 15, 2015
Finland	May 16, 2015
Denmark	May 16, 2015
France	May 16, 2015
Poland	May 16, 2015
United Kingdom	May 16, 2015
Europe	May 17, 2015
Canada	May 17, 2015
United States	May 17, 2015
South Korea	May 19, 2015

== See also ==
- List of Billboard 200 number-one albums of 2015
- List of concept albums
