= The Judge (song) =

Twenty One Pilots song

Song by Twenty One Pilots

from the album Blurryface
- Released: May 17, 2015
- Studio: Livingston Studios; (London, United Kingdom)
- Genre: Pop; folk; emo rap
- Length: 4:58
- Label: Fueled by Ramen
- Songwriter: Tyler Joseph
- Producer: Mike Crossey

"The Judge" is a song by American musical duo Twenty One Pilots. It was released on their fourth studio album Blurryface in May 2015. It was written by Tyler Joseph and produced by Mike Crossey.

== Background ==
On their fourth studio album Blurryface, lead vocalist Tyler Joseph explored various lyrical and musical styles throughout several of its songs. "The Judge" was one of the softer moments in the album and features repetitive lyrics that are driven by a narrative.

Drawing inspiration from the use of ukulele, "The Judge" is the first track to introduce Joseph's usage of the instrument into the framework of Blurryface. It is a tender sing-along that stands in contrast with the album's darker themes as one of the most sonically radio-friendly songs.

== Recording ==
"The Judge" was produced by Mike Crossey and recorded at Livingston Studios in London, United Kingdom. The track was then mixed at The Casita in Hollywood, California and mastered at Sterling Sound in New York City. It is built on Joseph lightly strumming his ukulele before additional instruments are incorporated into the arrangement. The band opted to eschew synthesized sounds in favor of the acoustic instruments such as piano and guitar in addition to vocals and marimba.

== Composition ==
"The Judge" is a pop song that lasts for a duration of four minutes and fifty-eight seconds. It is a summery sing along with an island flavor that is based on ukulele folk and enduring emo. The track features acoustic guitar and piano, marimba tones, soulful singing, rapping and multiple changes in time signature. According to the sheet music published at Musicnotes.com by Alfred Publishing Co., Inc, the song is written in the time signature of common time, with a tempo of 80 beats per minute. "The Judge" is composed in the key of A Minor while Tyler Joseph's vocal range spans two octaves, from the low-note of D_{3} to the high-note D_{5}. The song has a basic sequence of Am–F–C–Dm–Am–F–C in the introduction and verses, changes to Em–B–Am–G during its pre-chorus, and follows F–C–G–Am–F–G–C–Am–F at the refrain as its chord progression.

The musical arrangement begins with an introduction, opening with ukulele strums and a cooing vocal refrain, "Na na na na, oh oh." Throughout the song, the ukulele-driven track gradually builds up and takes on more musical layers. At the chorus, percussive piano keys create buoyant piano pop while Joseph recites a hook. Joseph rises to the falsetto range as he blissfully sings the emotive chorus, asking, "You're the judge, oh no, set me free." Towards its end, a piano solo takes lead before all of the instruments come together in a conclusion.

Lyrically, "The Judge" finds Joseph struggling with his inner demons and examining his psyche. He blithely communicates despair, exuding feelings of fear and anxiety. The repetitive yet catchy lyrics appear as a stream of consciousness. They convey thoughts pertaining to situations in life and over thinking about writing the song itself. Joseph confesses, "I don't know if this song is a surrender or a revel/I don't know if this song is about me or the devil." While his storytelling lyrics are personal in nature, they also inspire equality.

== Critical reception ==
AllMusic's Neil Z Yeung wrote, "Despite the intensity of some of the lyrics, when one focuses strictly on the music, it's a party... Joseph strums his ukulele to effective measure on 'The Judge'." Sharing similar sentiments, Anne Nickoloff and Troy Smith from The Plain Dealer stated, "Of all the Twenty One Pilots ukulele-based songs, 'The Judge' stands out on top with its free-flying vocals and lyrical storytelling. By the end of the song, the light strumming collides with a playful piano singalong bop—a needed sonic contrast to the darker themes on the rest of Blurryface. However, Smith also felt "The Judge" was as among the songs which dragged the album down, and was critical of its "overlong emo." Writing for Eagle News Online, Ashley Wolf favorably compared "The Judge" to that of Jason Mraz's music, claiming it was "the most pop-sounding song on the album. It is possible that if this song became a single, pop and hip hop radio stations across the country would have the track on instant replay for the entire summer." Dan Leroy for Alternative Press considered "The Judge" to be the album's standout track. He said, "What it is is the best pure pop song the band has come up with yet, taking the simple ukulele folk of Vessel's "House of Gold" and sculpting it into summer singalong nirvana." Jason Pettigrew, from the same publication, added, "This classic from Blurryface is totally awesome for one great reason: Dun makes it swing from revival meeting to teenage dance party. Totally groovy." The Austin Chronicle writer Kevin Curtin remarked, "these aviators... inspire equality with 'The Judge.'" Writing for Gapers Block, Zac Blumenfeld praised the song's music, saying, "Joseph has found a masterful way to connect with people their age and become their inner demons, expressing blithe despair through his ukulele in 'The Judge.'" Emily Jayne Beard from PopBuzz opined, "...you'll stay for the softer moments like "The Judge"... which delve even deeper into Joseph's psyche." Kerrang!'s Emily Carter characterized "The Judge" as being a "touching ukulele sing-along." Conversely, Rolling Stone Australia writer Rod Yates unfavorably compared the song's style to that of American singer-songwriter Jason Mraz. Likewise, Cole Waterman from Spectrum Culture said, "'The Judge', ...is unpleasantly reminiscent of Israel Kamakawiwo'ole's 'Somewhere Over the Rainbow.' Even worse, as the tune’s overwrought refrain emerges, it mirrors the wincingly-prosaic cheeseball indie rock of Fun."

=== Accolades ===
"The Judge" was ranked number eight by Billboard critics on their "Top 40 Deep Cuts by Popular Rock Bands of the 21st Century" list. Billboard writer Chris Payne remarked, "Who was it that decided Twenty One Pilots' most Billy Joel–sounding song shouldn't be a single? ...'The Judge' bops along like a polite ukulele ditty, then lodges permanently in your brain when Tyler Joseph pounds the ivories and drops an immaculate falsetto hook."

== Commercial performance ==
Despite not being released as a single, "The Judge" became a hit song. It peaked at number thirty-two on the U.S. Billboard Hot Rock & Alternative Songs chart for the date issued June 13, 2015. The song has also accumulated more plays on the streaming platform Spotify than any other non-single by Twenty One Pilots. On January 17, 2019, "The Judge" was certified Platinum by the Recording Industry Association of America (RIAA) for sales of over 1,000,000 paid digital downloads.

== Live performances ==
Twenty One Pilots performed "The Judge" during a sold-out concert at The Powerstation in Auckland, New Zealand on July 9, 2015. The duo gave a live performance "The Judge" for a live venue held at Shepherd's Bush Empire in West London, England on November 8, 2015. Before an audience of the thousands who were wearing beanie hats, they performed on a stage with red and white lighting, creating a dark yet warm atmosphere. Twenty One Pilots provided a live rendition of "The Judge" at the Aragon Ballroom when WKQX hosted the first of its four "Nights We Stole Christmas" concerts on December 3, 2015. Twenty One Pilots performed "The Judge" for an audience of 15,000 during a concert at Amalie Arena in Tampa, Florida on November 3, 2018. Tyler Joseph wore a flowery caftan while strumming a ukulele as stagehands wearing gas masks sprayed the stage with colorless gas. The band provided a live performance of "The Judge" for the fifteenth consecutive sold-out concert at The BB&T Center in Sunrise, Florida during their Bandito Tour on November 4, 2018. Josh Dun performed a drum solo while Joseph changed into a flower-printed shirt and strummed a ukulele as they segued into the song.

== Charts ==
=== Weekly charts ===
Chart (2015–16)	Peak position
US Hot Rock & Alternative Songs (Billboard)	32

=== Year-end charts ===
Chart (2015)	Position
US Hot Rock Songs (Billboard)	68

== Certifications ==
Region	Certification	Certified units/sales
Australia (ARIA)	Gold	35,000^{‡}
Canada (Music Canada)	Platinum	80,000^{‡}
New Zealand (RMNZ)	Gold	15,000^{‡}
Poland (ZPAV)	Gold	25,000^{‡}
United Kingdom (BPI)	Silver	200,000^{‡}
United States (RIAA)	Platinum	1,000,000^{‡}
^{‡} Sales+streaming figures based on certification alone.

== Personnel ==
Credits adapted from the liner notes of Blurryface.

- Tyler Joseph – piano, lead vocals, backing vocals, gang vocals, Hammond organ, synths, ukulele
- Josh Dun – drums, percussion, backing vocals
- Mike Crossey – production, programming, bass, synths and gang vocals
- Jonathan Gilmore – engineering, gang vocals
- Neal Avron – audio mixing
- Chris Gehringer – audio mastering
- Scott Skrzynski – assistant audio mixing
