= Lane Boy =

Twenty One Pilots song

Single by Twenty One Pilots

from the album Blurryface
- Released: May 4, 2015
- Studio: Serenity West Recording (Hollywood, Los Angeles)
- Genre: Alternative hip hop; reggae; jungle; dubstep; rock
- Length: 4:13 (album version); 3:56 (video version)
- Label: Fueled by Ramen
- Songwriter: Tyler Joseph
- Producer: Ricky Reed

Twenty One Pilots singles chronology
"Stressed Out" (2015)	"Lane Boy" (2015)	"Ride" (2016)

Music video
- "Lane Boy" on YouTube

"Lane Boy" is a song written and recorded by American musical duo Twenty One Pilots, for their fourth studio album, Blurryface. "Lane Boy" was released on YouTube worldwide on May 4, 2015, being released as a single on Google Play Store on the same day. The music video was released on July 20, 2015.

== Background ==
The direction of Blurryface elaborated on the lyrical theme Twenty One Pilots had honed by the arrival of their third album Vessel, where primary discussion topics were feelings of self-doubt and insecurity as well as how to overcome them. They continued addressing these topics with their fourth studio album, but projected them onto the pressure to release a second consecutive hit album, including on single "Lane Boy." It both musically and lyrically scorns at the notion of staying in one's lane. With the song, the fourth wall is broken as Twenty One Pilots explores what it's like working in the modern music industry.

During an interview with Fuse, Tyler Joseph said, "For us, music has always been about transparency, so for me 'Lane Boy' is that song on the record that you kind of break that fourth wall and you can look into what it's like to really be a normal person in our position." Even though Blurryface maintained Joseph's concerns relating to real life and the world at large, the album also contained a moment of personal disagreement with "Lane Boy." The song is about discarding others' expectations and demands, specifically in regards to where the duo's place was in the industry, and the greater scheme of where they fit in contemporary music culture. In an interview with Alternative Press, Joseph further explained, "I describe 'Lane Boy' as the moment where I broke character. Saying things that weren't necessarily artistic or beautiful, but exactly what I wanted to say and exactly what I was feeling. I broke character and became a frustrated human. For a moment. I don't imagine needing to say things like that anymore. I remember showing that song to some people and they said, 'I don't think you want to say that...' And Josh said to me, 'Let's say it.'" However, Dun said not to read too far into a certain line in "Lane Boy" pertaining to the current state of music, because he himself actually does listen to top radio tracks for musical influence. Dun said, "That song in no way is to meant to bash the industry or the whole idea of singles, I've always been intrigued by Billboard Top 40. ...And I enjoy it, anyway. It's not a loss to incorporate some of that stuff."

== Recording ==
"Lane Boy" was produced by Ricky Reed and recorded at Serenity West Recording in Hollywood, California. The track was then mixed at The Casita in Hollywood, California and mastered at Sterling Sound in New York City. Compared to tracks from Blurryface that were produced by Mike Elizondo, "Lane Boy" is influenced by Reed's more pop production and contains chattery programming. One new musical left-turn which stood out on their fourth studio album was the reggae brimming throughout, with songs such as "Lane Boy" taking inspired dub detours. The song has a chorus where Joseph sings what can be perceived as an explanation of their approach, a music genre mashup they'd called "Schizoid-Pop." According to Dun, while navigating pop and other influences was difficult, places of inspiration they drew from ranged from European reggae to his parents. He claimed, "Sometimes I think, 'Well, my mom would like this kind of song.'" He continued saying, "The challenge is really making it us. Because the scary thing is taking a lot of different influences or things that you love and meshing it all together, but then it could turn into some crazy toxic sludge that doesn't make any sense. ...We really have to work to make it a Twenty One Pilots song and not this crazy thing. That's the challenge, but it's also the fun part."

An official remix of "Lane Boy" was created by hip hop record producer DJ Premier. In an interview with Complex over e-mail, Premier explained, "While I was in L.A. recording with Dr. Dre for the Compton soundtrack, one of my homies told my tour manager to check out Twenty One Pilots. I bought Blurryface and liked it immediately, so I started looking for videos as well. I saw the 'Lane Boy' video and loved the concept of the song and video. It's about refuting the idea that artists should stay in a 'lane' or be defined by a particular style or sound." "Lane Boy" was the song DJ Premier desired to remix after watching the videos. Twenty One Pilots sent the stems for the track over to Premier and told him to rock out with it. For the remix, Premier decreases the tempo of its instrumental in order to give the track a slow, mellow vibe. Towards the end, he integrates his trademark scratching.

Alexa Shouneyia for Billboard stated, "If you loved Twenty One Pilots' 'Lane Boy' before, get ready to fall in love all over again with DJ Premier's remix... DJ Premier definitely takes the track into his own lane." Jessie Morris from Complex described the official remix as an "essential new banger."

== Composition ==
"Lane Boy" is an alternative hip hop song that runs four minutes and thirteen seconds. The genre-bending track is infused with reggae and has textures that feature a hybrid of musical styles, including jungle, dubstep, hip-hop, electropop-inspired rock, dancehall and ska rock. The musical composition consists of Tyler Joseph singing and rapping over a computerized instrumental, accompanied by a light drum line. The song's breezy instrumentation maintains a distinctive Caribbean groove, which is underscored by a plucked melody and Josh Dun's drumming. Joseph delivers his lyrics in a hard, staccato style of rapping over a kaleidoscopic mixture of reggae rhythms, electronic beats, bouncy reggae rock and urgent, full-bore EDM. According to the sheet music published at Musicnotes.com by Alfred Music, the song is written in the time signature of common time, with a moderately fast tempo of 160 beats per minute. "Lane Boy" is composed in the key of A minor while Tyler Joseph's vocal range spans one octave and five notes from a low of F_{3} to a high of C_{5}.

"Lane Boy"
"Lane Boy" is an alternative hip hop track infused with reggae. The song contains an unorthodox mixture of musical styles as well as a mission statement. Tyler Joseph performs both frenetic rapping in double-time in addition to singing during the chorus over hyperactive electronic beats.

With a frenetic vocal style, Joseph both raps in double-time and belts melodic lines as the composition meanders into dub-inspired passages before entering a convulsive drum'n'bass section. At the chorus, Joseph sings in a laid-back vocal tone before the track transforms roughly halfway as grizzly synths are introduced alongside robotic voices, distorted bass guitar and two-step drumming. During the middle of the song, the vocals pause and techno beats take over in a spontaneous mashup of bass and drum. The track devolves from swaggering to a pause in order to accommodate for an urgent dubstep breakdown replete with zippy synths, percussion and pulsating, full-fledged EDM. After its trek through an abundance of breakdowns, "Lane Boy" closes with an electro jubilee. At its conclusion, the musical composition exhibits anthemic electropop-tinged rock sounds.

Lyrically, "Lane Boy" is a meta-manifesto about doing what one desires and not following a set path. It discusses how Twenty One Pilots is able to craft music that suits the mainstream, but that doesn't define them. On "Lane Boy", the duo break the fourth wall while exploring their experience working in the contemporary music industry and defiantly defending their experimental musical approach. The song's rich lyrical content is laden with character. Tyler Joseph exhibits tongue-twisting, mercurial rapping that propels the conviction of his personal nonconformist spirit. His lines are scathing indictment of narrow-minded music industry practices. He mocks the strictures of record companies, rapping, "If it was our way, we'd have a tempo change every other time change." Nevertheless, Joseph admits their driving, clear pop sensibilities come with a heavy burden: "Honest, there's a few songs on this record that feel common / I'm in constant confrontation with what I want and what is poppin' / In the industry / It seems to me that singles on the radio are currency / My creativity's only free when I'm playing shows." As a warning, Joseph advises, "Don't trust a perfect person and don't trust a song that's flawless." "Lane Boy" harbors something of a mission statement. During its chorus, Joseph mockingly commands, "You should stay in your lane, boy." He continues singing, "They say, 'Stay in your lane, boy' / But we go where we want to". He backhands his seniors at major record labels with the snide remark, "Will they be alive tomorrow?"

== Critical reception ==
Billboard's Garrett Kamps compared "Lane Boy" to the work of Jamaican sound engineer King Tubby while labeling the single "especially schizoid." Stereogum's Chris DeVille said, "And the DnB/reggae/rap rave-up “Lane Boy” musically and lyrically scoffs at the notion of staying in your lane. Given where they've been and where they're going, it appears they don't have to." Alternative Press commented, "'Don't trust a perfect person and don't trust a song that's flawless,' warns on the furious reggae/jungle/dubstep hybrid 'Lane Boy.' And he's absolutely right; great art is rarely made by normal people." Citing it as the album's "big push-back moment," Jason Pettigrew, from the same publication, mused, "Although he wouldn't publicly use this vernacular, the reggae/jungle/dubstep amalgam 'Lane Boy' is the duo's 'fuck-you' song." He ranked "Lane Boy" as the band's penultimate song, calling it, "The most attitude-laden track in the TOP songbook." Kerrang!'s Emily Carter called the song an "electropop-infused rock anthem." Sam Law, from the same publication, opined, "'Lane Boy' pips 'Ride' by dent of its richer lyrical treatment. Cruising on that breezy instrumentation, we get wave after wave of attitude as Tyler unloads on music industry narrow-mindedness... before showcasing the mercurial best of the TØP sound with a barrage of tongue-twisting staccato rap and explosions of EDM/dubstep colour. A song to overtake to." Rolling Stone Australia writer Rod Yates deemed the song "a defiant defence of their genre-hopping." Madison Desler of Orange County Register quipped that the song's refrain, "may be the best explanation of their genre-busting approach.'" Anne Nickoloff and Troy Smith from The Plain Dealer remarked, "It's far from being a flawless song – and that's the whole point." Going further, Smith stated, "the ending of 'Lane Boy' evokes the best electropop aspects of Vessel." Liam Dryden of PopBuzz claimed, "new single "Lane Boy" has definitely been a standout track." Writing for Eagle News Online, Ashley Wolf commented, "Tracks such as “Lane Boy," ...are much more dubstep than their usual rap/hip-hop sound. ...The introduction of new genres adds to the duo's authenticity and originality as well as proves to the listeners that they took the time to find a way to add variation to their sound." In a less favorable review, Cole Waterman from Spectrum Culture opined, "Joseph merits some cred for his self-awareness with 'Honestly, there's a few songs on this record that feel common,' a lyric from 'Lane Boy,' but referencing mediocrity doesn't excuse one for creating it."

== Music video ==
Twenty One Pilots released the music video for "Lane Boy" on July 20, 2015. During an interview with Fuse, Tyler Joseph provided a breakdown of the music video. According to Joseph, "It's kind of a manifestation of that battle with seeing some success."

The music video features Tyler Joseph slowly being followed by a pair of men wearing hazmat suits in the dark. It blends and splices in video footage from a recent live concert performance. Throughout the video, Joseph appears to obey the men by bending down and listening to them while almost being in choreography with their grooving movements. Once the duo get out in front of a like-minded audience, they kneel down to them. Joseph then delivers a subtitled monologue:

Why do I kneel to these concepts? Tempted by control, controlled by temptation. "Stay low," they say. "Stay low."

Afterwards, Joseph, the pair of men, and the crowd jumps together during the final drop. The video ends with the men kneeling as Joseph dances alone with the crowd.

=== Reception ===
Characterizing it as being "both creepy and epic," PopBuzz's Liam Dryden called the music video a "standout." Rachel Campell from Alternative Press considered the use of live footage for the video creative.

== Live performances ==
"Lane Boy" has since become a crowd favorite at live concert venues. Twenty One Pilots performed "Lane Boy" during a concert held at Comerica Theatre on in Downtown Phoenix, Arizona October 14, 2015. The duo began their performance with video effects of men in hazmat suits and gas masks dancing before shifting to live stage performer dancing in hazmat suits and gas masks, all while in keeping with the song's lyrics.

They performed the song an at the Forum in Inglewood, California during their Emotional Roadshow World Tour, emphasizing the reggae beats and rhythms during their arena performance.

While still on the tour the duo provided a live rendition at the Honda Center in Anaheim on February 15, 2017. The concert was a spectacle, featuring two stages and a giant hamster ball.

Twenty One Pilots performed "Lane Boy" before an audience at a sold-out concert at PPG Paints Arena in Pittsburgh, Pennsylvania on July 5, 2019. "Lane Boy" was among the tracks the duo performed during a medley for a concert held at Wells Fargo Arena in Des Moines, Iowa on their Bandito Tour. Joseph performed wearing a scarf over his head while smoke filled the stage as men with gas masks sprayed more down onto the crowd.

== Track listing ==
Digital download / stream
No.	Title	Length
1.	"Lane Boy"	4:13

CD single
No.	Title	Length
1.	"Lane Boy"	4:13
2.	"Lane Boy" (video version)	3:56
3.	"Lane Boy" (instrumental)	4:13
4.	"Lane Boy" (TV track)	4:13
5.	"Lane Boy" (a cappella)	4:13

== Personnel ==
- Tyler Joseph – vocals, programming, piano
- Josh Dun – drums
- Ricky Reed – producer, programming, bass guitar
- Drew Kapner – engineer
- Michael Peterson – assistant engineer
- Neal Avron – mixing engineer
- Scott Skrzynski – assistant mix engineer
- Chris Gehringer – mastering engineer

== Charts ==
=== Peak positions ===
Chart (2015)	Peak position
Mexico Ingles Airplay (Billboard)	24
US Hot Rock & Alternative Songs (Billboard)	28

=== Year-end charts ===
Chart (2015)	Position
US Billboard Hot Rock Songs	61

== Certifications ==
Region	Certification	Certified units/sales
Australia (ARIA)	Gold	35,000^{‡}
Canada (Music Canada)	Platinum	80,000^{‡}
New Zealand (RMNZ)	Platinum	30,000^{‡}
Poland (ZPAV)	Platinum	20,000^{‡}
United States (RIAA)	2× Platinum	2,000,000^{‡}
^{‡} Sales+streaming figures based on certification alone.

== Release history ==
Region	Date	Format	Label
Worldwide	May 4, 2015	Digital download; stream	Fueled by Ramen
UK Radio	October 21, 2016	Airplay	Fueled by Ramen
