= Tear in My Heart =

Twenty One Pilots song

Single by Twenty One Pilots

from the album Blurryface
- Released: April 6, 2015
- Studio: Serenity West Recording (Hollywood, Los Angeles)
- Genre: Pop; indie pop; rock; pop rock
- Length: 3:08
- Label: Fueled by Ramen
- Songwriter: Tyler Joseph
- Producer: Ricky Reed

Twenty One Pilots singles chronology
"Fairly Local" (2015)	"Tear in My Heart" (2015)	"Stressed Out" (2015)

Music video
- "Tear in My Heart" on YouTube

"Tear in My Heart" is a song written and recorded by American musical duo Twenty One Pilots, for their fourth studio album Blurryface (2015). The song was released as a single on April 6, 2015 and was released to radio on April 14 of the same year.

== Background ==
"Tear in My Heart" is an ode dedicated to a loved one, with Tyler Joseph's wife Jenna being the inspiration behind the song. As an unabashed love song, "Tear in My Heart" finds Joseph in a romantic prose as he writes for his wife Jenna. In particular, its bridge was based on Joseph's personal experience driving long hours back to Columbus, Ohio from a family vacation trip as his future-wife Jenna slept, which left him to deal with all the traffic. "Tear in My Heart" is about how Joseph's wife shocked him out of stasis. By talking about falling in love, it acts as a break from morbidity of which prevailed much of Blurryface.

== Composition ==
"Tear in My Heart" is an uptempo pop song that runs for a duration of three minutes and eight seconds. The track has exuberant, summery sounds which delve into indie pop that are driven by shining, piano-based rock instrumentation. According to the sheet music published at Musicnotes.com by Alfred Music, it is written in the time signature of common time, with a moderately fast tempo of 120 beats per minute. "Tear in My Heart" is composed in the key of D major, while Tyler Joseph's vocal range spans one octave and six notes, from a low of F_{3} to a high of D_{5}. The song has a basic sequence of D–F♯–G in the introduction and verses, alternates between the chords of A_{7} and A during its pre-chorus, follows G_{(add9)}–A–Bm–A/C♯–D–A at the refrain, and has a single chord of D major during the bridge as its chord progression.

The musical composition is built from piano chord stabs and trance keyboards and includes a breakdown consisting of finger-snapping. "Tear in My Heart" is strong, hook-laden number propelled by a prominent piano accompaniment. Opening with a pounding major triad, the musical arrangement begins with its piano motif. The song has an upbeat atmosphere, with happy sounding piano chords and sunny, synth-driven melodies intertwining at the anthemic chorus. During its bridge, a propulsive, one-chord vamp is played throughout in D minor with a swing feel.

Lyrically, "Tear in My Heart" is an uplifting love song that expresses goofy, sincere lines. The playful song contains tongue-in-cheek lyrics and is decorated with a buoyant chorus: "My heart is my armor / she's the tear in my heart / she's a carver." Joseph's poetic lyrics have him honestly professing great love through revealingly graphic imagery: "She's a carver / She's a butcher with a smile." During the second verse, in a beguiling moment, he sings, "The songs on the radio are okay, but my taste in music is your face." At the song's bridge, Joseph sings about driving while trying to avoid waking a companion who is sleeping in his car by hitting potholes. He sings relatable lines about driving with her: "You fell asleep in my car, I drove the whole time, but that's okay, I'll just avoid the holes so you sleep fine / I'm driving here I sit, cursing my government, for not using my taxes to fill holes with more cement."

== Critical reception ==
Brian Kraus for Alternative Press labeled "Tear in My Heart" an "exuberant pop number." Dan Leroy from the same publication praised it as an "uplifting love song harnessed to an equally buoyant chorus" and claimed it depicted a more playful side of Twenty One Pilots. Slate's Carl Wilson considered the song's bridge, "a goofily touching moment, but it also evokes the absence of infrastructure, of a social contract that is failing to care and protect." Anne Nickoloff and Troy Smith from The Plain Dealer opined, "The lyrics are, at times, heartwarming... and occasionally cheesy." Going further, Smith called the song "catchy" and said "has a David Bowie meets Death Cab for Cutie vibe to it." Jo Ferraro from New Haven Register remarked, "the sunny, synth-driven melodies of "Tear in My Heart" verge on Beatle-esque, with a little bit of "Pure Imagination" Willy Wonka thrown in." Kevin Curtis for The Austin Chronicle claimed, "these aviators rock honest love on 'Tear in My Heart.'" Kerrang!'s Sam Law said, "An unabashed love song, 'Tear in My Heart' finds Tyler on giddily romantic form as he writes a Valentine for his wife Jenna. Built from sunshine and fluttering heartbeats, shining instrumentation holds aloft lyrics that are in turn revealingly poetic, wholly relatable and beguilingly cheesy-as-hell. All the while, you know the love is real."

Citing it the band's first crossover hit single, Spin's Brennan Carley remarked the song was "unlike any of Reed's other smashes". André Curcic from Renowned for Sound called the single "extremely catchy and summer anthem-like. This track showcases a more pop-friendly sound that shows diversity in the album." Loudwire's Chad Childers remarked, "The duo of Tyler Joseph and Josh Dun showed promise on their prior records, but Blurryface was the one that catapulted them to superstardom with a string of immensely popular songs. It all started with the incredibly catchy ode to a loved one 'Tear in My Heart.'" Regarding it as a "triumph", PopMatters's Joshua Copperman hailed "Tear in My Heart" as the duo's "best pure pop single." Maria Sherman of Fuse called the song "one of the best rock tunes of the year."

=== Accolades ===
"Tear in My Heart" received a nomination for Choice Music: Rock Song at the 2016 Teen Choice Awards. The song was also cited as the tenth most reblogged song of the year by Rock Sound.

== Commercial performance ==
While the duo had found sporadic alternative radio success with Vessel and had been slowly gaining a following that extended outside their hometown of Columbus, Ohio, "Tear in My Heart" was their first notable nationwide radio success. The song peaked at number two on the US Billboard Alternative Songs chart in July 2015.

== Music video ==
The music video for "Tear in My Heart" was directed by Marc Klasfeld and filmed in Chinatown, Los Angeles. Alongside both band members, lead singer Tyler Joseph's wife Jenna Black, whom he married the previous month, also appears in the music video. Tyler and Jenna practiced a fight scene together for the "Tear in My Heart" video. Klasfeld gave the couple a thirty-second video clip of choreography for the fight scene and had them re-enact it. In an Alternative Press interview, Jenna recalled, "It was really late at night when we got it. I'm sure the people around our hotel were like, 'What are they doing in there?'" During the actual shoot, Tyler told Jenna not to worry and just go for it. She imparted, "The very first time I had to fake-throw him, he just took it. There were definitely moments where I could feel that I hit him so hard. He definitely got bruised that day."

In contrast to the wintry music video for their lead single "Fairly Local," the video for "Tear in My Heart" is colorful, being set in a Chinatown. It depicts Tyler Joseph and Josh Dun performing in Chinatown in the town square. The video also stars Tyler's wife Jenna Joseph, who had served as the inspiration behind the song. She appears throughout the music video beating up her husband until he bleeds.

== Live performances ==
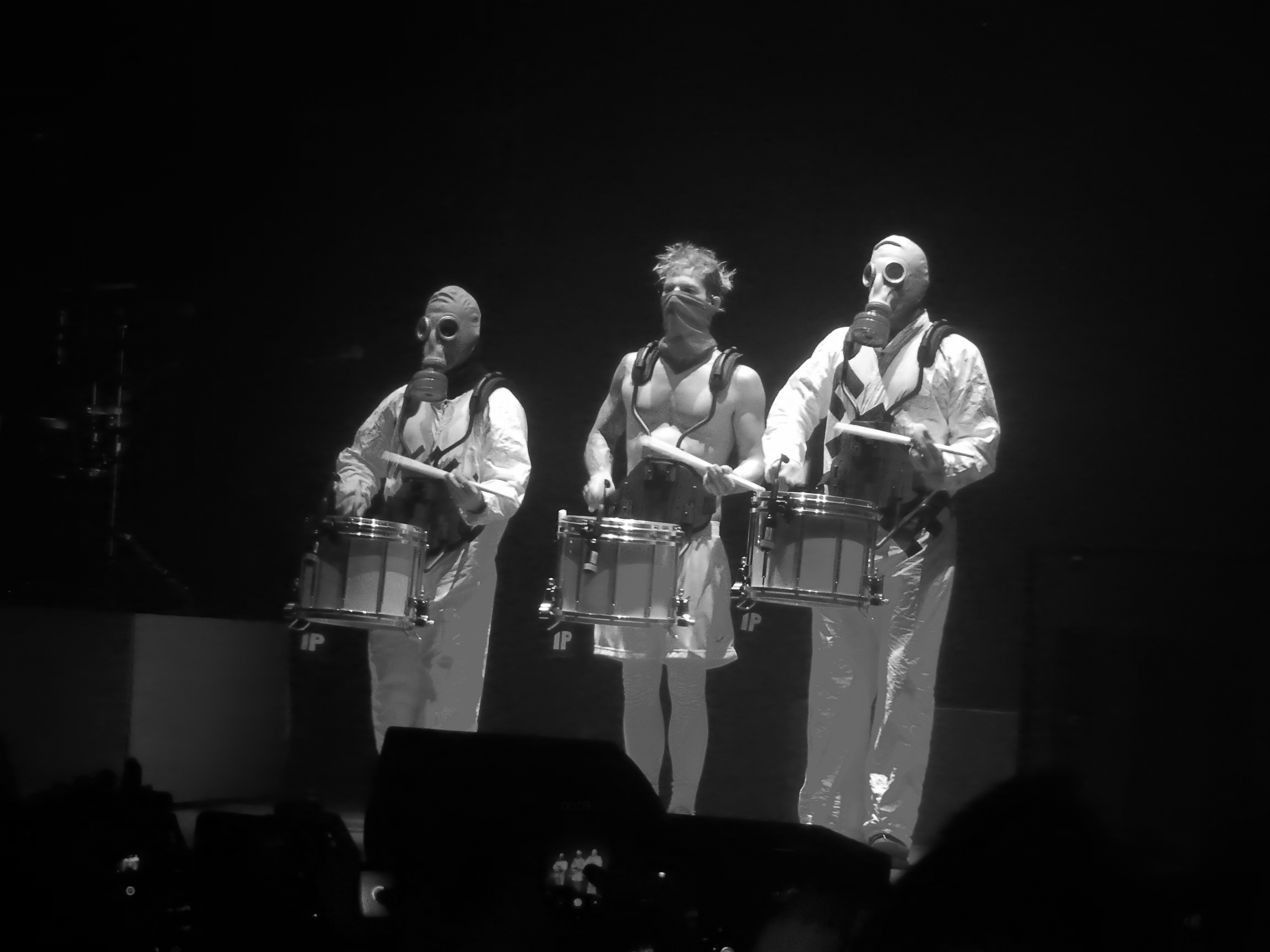
An image of how Twenty One Pilots performed the "Tear in My Heart" remix when live.

Twenty One Pilots concluded a sold-out concert at Greek Theatre in Los Angeles, California with a live rendition of "Tear in My Heart" before segueing into an encore performance of "Goner" and "Trees." The duo were beating bass drums as they were held up by fans in a pit before being swept off the stage.

== Track listing ==
Digital download / stream
No.	Title	Length
1.	"Tear in My Heart"	3:08

== Personnel ==
Twenty One Pilots

- Tyler Joseph – songwriting, vocals, piano, guitar, keyboards, programming, executive producer, co-producer
- Josh Dun – drums, backing vocals

Additional personnel

- Ricky Reed – producer, bass guitar, programming, executive producer
- Drew Kapner – engineering
- Alex Gruszecki – assistant engineer
- Neal Avron – mixing
- Scott Skrzynski – assistant mix engineer
- Chris Wolton – executive producer

== Charts ==
=== Weekly charts ===
Chart (2015–16)	Peak position
Australia (ARIA)	60
Canada Hot 100 (Billboard)	88
Canada Rock (Billboard)	11
Japan Hot 100 (Billboard)	68
US Billboard Hot 100	82
US Hot Rock & Alternative Songs (Billboard)	6
US Rock & Alternative Airplay (Billboard)	2

=== Year-end charts ===
Chart (2015)	Position
US Hot Rock Songs (Billboard)	14
US Rock Airplay (Billboard)	9

== Certifications ==
Region	Certification	Certified units/sales
Australia (ARIA)	Platinum	70,000^{‡}
Canada (Music Canada)	3× Platinum	240,000^{‡}
New Zealand (RMNZ)	Platinum	30,000^{‡}
Poland (ZPAV)	Platinum	20,000^{‡}
United Kingdom (BPI)	Gold	400,000^{‡}
United States (RIAA)	3× Platinum	3,000,000^{‡}
^{‡} Sales+streaming figures based on certification alone.

== Release history ==
Region	Date	Format	Label
Worldwide	April 6, 2015	Digital download; stream	Fueled by Ramen
