= Doubt (Twenty One Pilots song) =

Twenty One Pilots song

Song by Twenty One Pilots

from the album Blurryface
- Released: May 17, 2015
- Length: 3:11
- Label: Fueled by Ramen
- Songwriter: Tyler Joseph
- Producers: Ricky Reed; Tyler Joseph

"Doubt" is a song by American musical duo Twenty One Pilots. First released as the eighth track of their fourth studio album Blurryface (2015), a demo version was released as a non-album single on April 9, 2025.

== Recording ==
For the recording of "Doubt", the duo heavily employed the use of auto-tune.

== Critical reception ==
Billboard critic Garrett Kamps likened it to "a Chris Brown outtake".

== Demo ==
"Doubt (demo)"

Single by Twenty One Pilots
- Released: April 9, 2025
- Length: 2:58
- Songwriter: Tyler Joseph

Twenty One Pilots singles chronology
"The Line" (2024)	"Doubt (demo)" (2025)	"The Contract" (2025)

Music video
- "Doubt (demo)" on YouTube

After the demo of the song went viral on the video sharing platform TikTok, the duo officially released the demo on April 9, 2025, almost ten years after the song originally appeared on Blurryface. Frontman Tyler Joseph revealed how the demo got released, after his mom called him and asked him, "Hey, did you know you have a song blowing up on TikTok?" The demo was released ahead of the celebration of the 10th anniversary of the album, which occurred on May 17, 2025.

== Charts ==
=== Weekly charts ===
Chart (2015–16)	Peak position
US Hot Rock & Alternative Songs (Billboard)	32

Chart (2025)	Peak position
Austria (Ö3 Austria Top 40)	45
Canada Hot 100 (Billboard)	96
Global 200 (Billboard)	152
Germany (GfK)	85
New Zealand Hot Singles (RMNZ)	9
Norway (VG-lista)	91
Sweden Heatseeker (Sverigetopplistan)	9
Switzerland (Schweizer Hitparade)	56
UK Singles Sales (OCC)	9
US Hot Rock & Alternative Songs (Billboard)	23

=== Year-end charts ===
Chart (2015)	Position
US Hot Rock Songs (Billboard)	73

== Certifications ==
Region	Certification	Certified units/sales
Australia (ARIA)	Gold	35,000^{‡}
Austria (IFPI Austria)	Gold	15,000^{‡}
Canada (Music Canada)	Platinum	80,000^{‡}
New Zealand (RMNZ)	Gold	15,000^{‡}
Poland (ZPAV)	Gold	25,000^{‡}
United Kingdom (BPI)	Silver	200,000^{‡}
United States (RIAA)	Platinum	1,000,000^{‡}
^{‡} Sales+streaming figures based on certification alone.
