= We Don't Believe What's on TV =

Twenty One Pilots song

Promotional single by Twenty One Pilots

from the album Blurryface
- B-side: "Ukulele Version"
- Released: May 17, 2016
- Studio: Paramount Studios, Hollywood
- Genre: Indie rock; folk punk
- Length: 2:57
- Label: Fueled by Ramen
- Songwriter: Tyler Joseph
- Producer: Ricky Reed

Twenty One Pilots singles chronology
"Heathens" (2016)	"We Don't Believe What's on TV" (2016)	"Cancer" (2016)

"We Don't Believe What's on TV" is a song by American musical duo Twenty One Pilots. The song was recorded by the band for their fourth studio album, Blurryface, and was also released as a promotional single. The song appears on the soundtrack of the film Power Rangers (2017). It was written by Twenty One Pilots frontman Tyler Joseph. The song also peaked at No. 36 on the US Hot Rock Songs chart.

== Composition ==
"We Don't Believe What's on TV" is an indie rock song that lasts for a duration of two minutes and fifty-seven seconds. According to the sheet music published at Musicnotes.com by Alfred Publishing Co., Inc, it is composed in the key of A Major and set in the time signature of common time, with a tempo of 120 beats per minute.

== Charts ==
=== Weekly charts ===
Chart (2015–16)	Peak position
US Hot Rock & Alternative Songs (Billboard)	36

=== Year-end charts ===
Chart (2016)	Position
US Hot Rock Songs (Billboard)	85

== Certifications ==
Region	Certification	Certified units/sales
Poland (ZPAV)	Gold	10,000^{‡}
United States (RIAA)	Platinum	1,000,000^{‡}
^{‡} Sales+streaming figures based on certification alone.
