= Heathens (Twenty One Pilots song) =

2016 song by Twenty One Pilots

Single by Twenty One Pilots

from the album Suicide Squad: The Album
- Released: June 16, 2016
- Recorded: 2016
- Genre: Rap rock; alternative rock
- Length: 3:15
- Label: Fueled by Ramen; Atlantic; Warner Bros.
- Songwriter: Tyler Joseph
- Producers: Mike Elizondo; Tyler Joseph

Twenty One Pilots singles chronology
"Ride" (2016)	"Heathens" (2016)	"We Don't Believe What's on TV" (2016)

Suicide Squad singles chronology
"Heathens" (2016)	"Sucker for Pain" (2016)

Music video
- "Heathens" on YouTube

"Heathens" is a song by American musical duo Twenty One Pilots, released as the lead single from the motion picture soundtrack to the DC Comics film Suicide Squad (2016) on June 16, 2016, through Atlantic Records. The song was written by Tyler Joseph and produced by him along with Mike Elizondo. "Heathens" peaked at number two on the US Billboard Hot 100, tying with "Stressed Out" for the duo's highest-charting single to date. "Heathens" was nominated for three Grammy Awards at the 59th annual awards ceremony.

== Background ==
On June 15, 2016, Twenty One Pilots tweeted a message in Morse code which read "takeitslow", a lyric taken from the song "Heathens". The following day, June 16, the song was revealed to be featured on the motion picture soundtrack for the 2016 American superhero film based on the DC Comics antihero team Suicide Squad. The soundtrack was released on August 5.

As I was writing the song I was like, I want this song to be a Twenty One Pilots song first. And I want it to resonate with our fans and make sense at our show. Even though the themes in the movie inspired the beginning of it, as the lyrics came together, and as the song came together, I realized, this was our song. – Tyler Joseph

== Composition ==
"Heathens" is a rap rock song that has a duration of three minutes and fifteen seconds. According to the sheet music published at Musicnotes.com by Alfred Music, it is written in the time signature of common time, with a moderate tempo of 90 beats per minute. "Heathens" is composed in the key of E minor, while Tyler Joseph's vocal range spans one octave and three notes, from a low of E_{3} to a high of G_{4}. The song has a basic sequence of C–Em–Am–Em in the verses, changes to C/E–Am–Em–C–Am–B_{7} during the pre-chorus, and follows C–Am–E at the refrain, bridge and outro as its chord progression.

== Critical reception ==
Sam Law of Kerrang! named it the band's sixth best song in April 2020, describing it as a "deliciously insidious single" and "largely unlike anything else they'd done". He further said that it was "the best thing to come out of 2016's otherwise almost-entirely abortive Suicide Squad adaptation".

== Commercial performance ==
The song peaked in the runner-up position for four consecutive weeks on the US Billboard Hot 100, but was kept out of the top spot by The Chainsmokers' "Closer", becoming the duo's second top five single on the Hot 100. It is the band's highest-peaking single, tied with "Stressed Out". It spent 18 consecutive weeks in the top 10 of the Hot 100 before dropping out on December 31, 2016.

With "Ride" charting at number five and "Heathens" at four in the same week, Twenty One Pilots became the third rock act with simultaneous top five Hot 100 singles in the chart's 58-year history, following only the Beatles and Elvis Presley, as well as the first duo in three years. "Heathens" reached number one on the Hot Rock Songs chart, and holds the record for second longest running single at number one, spending 30 weeks at the summit. The song also peaked at number one on the Alternative Songs chart, and reached the top 20 in a variety of other charts. By September 2017, "Heathens" had sold over 2.1 million copies in the US. The song is the second by the band to be certified Diamond, indicating sales of over 10 million copies.

The song also reached number five on the UK Singles Chart. "Heathens" also made it into the top 10 in more than 15 countries, including Australia, Belgium, Canada and Switzerland.

=== Accolades ===
"Heathens" was nominated for Best Song Written and/or Recording Created for a Film at the Guild of Music Supervisors Awards, and for Best Rock Performance, Best Rock Song and Best Song Written for Visual Media at the 59th Annual Grammy Awards. At the 2017 iHeartRadio Music Awards, it was nominated for Best Song from a Movie and Best Lyrics, and won Alternative Rock Song of the Year. The song was nominated for Favorite Song at the 2017 Kids' Choice Awards. At the 2017 Billboard Music Awards, "Heathens" received nominations for Top Hot 100 Song, Top Selling Song and Best Rock Song, winning the latter. The song was nominated for International Hit of the Year at the 2017 MTV MIAW Awards, and for Choice Rock/Alternative Song and Choice Song: Group at the 2017 Teen Choice Awards.

== Music video ==
The music video for "Heathens", directed by Andrew Donoho, was uploaded to the Fueled by Ramen YouTube channel in June 2016. It shows Tyler Joseph singing the song in the prison Belle Reve, with Josh Dun appearing while playing drums during the course of the video. Joseph makes his way to a small stage in the middle of a room, where Dun is already on the stage playing the drums. Joseph then picks up a floating bass guitar and begins playing it while the prisoners leave their cells and watch the duo perform the remainder of the song. At the end of the video, Joseph is sitting in the room alone as the prison security guards surround him. Throughout the music video, various clips from Suicide Squad are played.

The video won an award for Best Rock Video at the 2016 MTV Video Music Awards, and was nominated for Best Music Video at the 2017 iHeartRadio Music Awards.

== Live performances ==
The band performed "Heathens" for the first time in concert at The Uptown Amphitheatre at the Music Factory in Charlotte, North Carolina, on June 28, 2016, as part of their Emotional Roadshow World Tour. The song was later performed as part of the band's appearance on episode two of Saturday Night Live's forty-second season. On June 9, 2022, the band performed a new version of the song in a mashup with "Car Radio" at their MTV Unplugged performance.

On July 22, 2022, the duo released a live performance video of the band performing a mashup of "Heathens" and the intro theme of Netflix series Stranger Things. It was also performed in February 2025 in Mexico City during the The Clancy World Tour, and later released as part of the live album More Than We Ever Imagined (Live in Mexico City) on August 7, 2026.

== Covers ==
Chicago-based rapper Vic Mensa performed a freestyle over the instrumental of the track. Opening with the band's chorus, the "heathens freestyle" features Mensa rapping for two minutes straight. His verse touches on real-life violence, providing insight into what he experienced first-hand growing up on the South Side of Chicago. The song's lyrics contain self-referential jokes regarding his sampling of Twenty One Pilots as well as a reference to the film Zenon: Girl of the 21st Century. Vic Mensa appeared in a cover art inspired by The Joker to accompany the freestyle. "Heathens" was covered by hard rock band Halestorm, for their cover album, Reanimate 3.0, released on January 6, 2017. The song was covered by the American indie pop band Blondfire. "Heathens" was featured in the Twenty One Pilots Mashup by Kurt Hugo Schneider, featuring VoicePlay. American metalcore band Wolves at the Gate released a cover of the song, as part of their cover album Lost in Translation, which was released on September 22, 2023.

== Usage in media ==
Seven days after the song's release, it was used to accompany television advertisements for the American TV show Chicago P.D. on RTÉ2, and was used to accompany the first half of a Problem Gambling documentary created by Davy Glennon, aired on Claire Byrne Live on November 22, 2016. "Heathens" was also performed live on July 15, 2022 at Electric Castle in Romania, as part of a collaboration with the Netflix series Stranger Things.

== Track listing ==
Digital download
No.	Title	Length
1.	"Heathens"	3:15

CD single
No.	Title	Length
1.	"Heathens"	3:15

== Personnel ==
- Tyler Joseph – vocals, piano, bass guitar, guitar, synthesizers, programming, keyboards
- Josh Dun – drums, electronic drums, percussion

=== Additional musicians ===
- Mike Elizondo – keyboards, programming

== Charts ==
=== Weekly charts ===
Chart (2016–2017)	Peak position
Argentina (Monitor Latino)	7
Australia (ARIA)	3
Austria (Ö3 Austria Top 40)	4
Belgium (Ultratop 50 Flanders)	10
Belgium (Ultratop 50 Wallonia)	16
Canada Hot 100 (Billboard)	3
Canada AC (Billboard)	33
Canada CHR/Top 40 (Billboard)	5
Canada Hot AC (Billboard)	15
Canada Rock (Billboard)	6
Colombia (National-Report)	74
CIS Airplay (TopHit)	7
Czech Republic Airplay (ČNS IFPI)	1
Czech Republic Singles Digital (ČNS IFPI)	1
Denmark (Tracklisten)	11
Finland (Suomen virallinen lista)	6
France (SNEP)	4
France Airplay (SNEP)	3
Germany (GfK)	9
Germany (Airplay Chart)	7
Hungary (Rádiós Top 40)	23
Hungary (Single Top 40)	7
Hungary (Stream Top 40)	2
Ireland (IRMA)	4
Italy (FIMI)	11
Lebanon (Lebanese Top 20)	9
Mexico Ingles Airplay (Billboard)	48
Netherlands (Dutch Top 40)	10
Netherlands (Single Top 100)	12
New Zealand (Recorded Music NZ)	2
Norway (VG-lista)	4
Poland Airplay (ZPAV)	8
Portugal (AFP)	4
Romania (Airplay 100)	72
Russia Airplay (TopHit)	9
Scottish Singles Sales (Official Charts)	5
Slovakia Airplay (ČNS IFPI)	37
Slovakia Singles Digital (ČNS IFPI)	1
Slovenia (SloTop50)	30
Spain (Promusicae)	25
Sweden (Sverigetopplistan)	6
Switzerland (Schweizer Hitparade)	3
UK Singles (Official Charts)	5
US Billboard Hot 100	2
US Adult Contemporary (Billboard)	25
US Adult Pop Airplay (Billboard)	2
US Dance Club Songs (Billboard)	16
US Dance Airplay (Billboard)	11
US Hot Rock & Alternative Songs (Billboard)	1
US Pop Airplay (Billboard)	2
US Rhythmic Airplay (Billboard)	33
US Rock & Alternative Airplay (Billboard)	1

=== Year-end charts ===
Chart (2016)	Position
Argentina (Monitor Latino)	62
Australia (ARIA)	27
Austria (Ö3 Austria Top 40)	18
Belgium (Ultratop Flanders)	53
Belgium (Ultratop Wallonia)	75
Canada (Canadian Hot 100)	22
Denmark (Tracklisten)	64
France (SNEP)	40
Germany (Official German Charts)	34
Hungary (Single Top 40)	31
Iceland (Plötutíóindi)	23
Italy (FIMI)	45
Netherlands (Dutch Top 40)	59
Netherlands (Single Top 100)	65
New Zealand (Recorded Music NZ)	24
Spain (PROMUSICAE)	79
Sweden (Sverigetopplistan)	49
Switzerland (Schweizer Hitparade)	34
UK Singles (OCC)	38
US Billboard Hot 100	21
US Adult Top 40 (Billboard)	37
US Hot Rock Songs (Billboard)	3
US Mainstream Top 40 (Billboard)	29
US Rock Airplay (Billboard)	10

Chart (2017)	Position
Canada (Canadian Hot 100)	67
France (SNEP)	117
Hungary (Single Top 40)	82
Hungary (Stream Top 40)	92
Israel (Media Forest)	39
Switzerland (Schweizer Hitparade)	81
US Billboard Hot 100	58
US Adult Top 40 (Billboard)	34
US Hot Rock Songs (Billboard)	2
US Rock Airplay (Billboard)	5

Chart (2025)	Position
Hungary (Rádiós Top 40)	51

=== Decade-end charts ===
Chart (2010–2019)	Position
US Billboard Hot 100	93
US Hot Rock Songs (Billboard)	6

== Certifications ==
Region	Certification	Certified units/sales
Australia (ARIA)	6× Platinum	420,000^{‡}
Austria (IFPI Austria)	3× Platinum	90,000^{‡}
Belgium (BRMA)	Platinum	20,000^{‡}
Canada (Music Canada)	Diamond	800,000^{‡}
Denmark (IFPI Danmark)	2× Platinum	180,000^{‡}
France (SNEP)	Diamond	233,333^{‡}
Germany (BVMI)	3× Gold	600,000^{‡}
Italy (FIMI)	3× Platinum	150,000^{‡}
Netherlands (NVPI)	Platinum	93,000^{‡}
New Zealand (RMNZ)	5× Platinum	150,000^{‡}
Poland (ZPAV)	4× Platinum	200,000^{‡}
Portugal (AFP)	2× Platinum	20,000^{‡}
Spain (Promusicae)	2× Platinum	120,000^{‡}
Switzerland (IFPI Switzerland)	Platinum	30,000^{‡}
United Kingdom (BPI)	3× Platinum	1,800,000^{‡}
United States (RIAA)	11× Platinum	11,000,000^{‡}
^{‡} Sales+streaming figures based on certification alone.

== Release history ==
Region	Date	Format	Label
Worldwide	June 16, 2016	Digital download; stream	Atlantic
United States	June 20, 2016	Contemporary hit radio	Atlantic

== See also ==
- List of best-selling singles in the United States
- List of number-one Billboard Rock Songs
