= Ride (Twenty One Pilots song) =

2016 single by Twenty One Pilots

Single by Twenty One Pilots

from the album Blurryface
- Released: April 12, 2016
- Recorded: 2014–2015
- Studio: Sonic Lounge Studios (Grove City, Ohio); Serenity West Recording (Hollywood, Los Angeles)
- Genre: Alternative hip hop; dub; rock; reggae; electropop
- Length: 3:34
- Label: Fueled by Ramen
- Songwriter: Tyler Joseph
- Producer: Ricky Reed

Twenty One Pilots singles chronology
| "Lane Boy" (2015) | "Ride" (2016) | "Heathens" (2016) |

Audio sample
- file; help

Music video
- "Ride" on YouTube

"Ride" is a song written and recorded by American musical duo Twenty One Pilots, from their fourth studio album, Blurryface. "Ride" was originally released as a promotional single on YouTube on May 11, 2015. The music video for the song was released on YouTube the following day. It was serviced to US contemporary hit radio on April 12, 2016, as the album's fifth official single. The song peaked at number 5 on the US Billboard Hot 100.

== Composition ==
"Ride" is an uptempo alternative rap song that lasts for a duration of three minutes and thirty-four seconds. The track combines elements of rock, hip hop, reggae, punk, electro and pop. According to the sheet music published at Musicnotes.com by Alfred Music, it written in the time signature of common time, with a fast tempo of 150 beats per minute. "Ride" is composed in the key of G-flat major, while Tyler Joseph's vocal range ranges from a low of D♭_{3} to a high of B♭_{4}. The song has a basic sequence of G–Am–Em–C/D during the introduction, changes to G–Am–Em–C–G–Am–Em–D_{sus2} in the sung verse, has G–Am–Em–C during the pre-chorus, follows G–Am–Em–C♭–G–Am–Em–D_{sus2} at the refrain, changes to G♭–A♭m–E♭m–C♭–G♭–A♭m– E♭m–C♭/D♭ in the rap verse and follows G♭–A♭m–D♭–E♭m–A♭m_{7(add4)}–E♭m–D♭–D♭/F♯ during the bridge as its chord progression.

The musical composition has a mix of infectious parts built on a rich reggae influence infused with rock sounds. The chilled-out number instrumentally exudes an upbeat reggae vibe, being drenched deeply in Caribbean-tinged riffs and shimmery synths. Josh Dun's slow, one-two drum beat binds together the track alongside a dark, brooding bassline. His drumming provides the upbeat track with rhythmic dexterity, playing in a punk-inspired fashion. Joseph recites contemplative rhymes over electropop-oriented reggae beats. His vocal parts demonstrate a crisp delivery, one that abruptly goes from balladry to rapping to screaming. After singing an opening verse, Joseph delivers his lyrics in a hard, staccato style of fast-paced rapping. The song's chorus and his proclamations come layered between verses that bear highly rhymthic sensibilities. The track's instrumental also takes dub-inspired deviations. At its bridge, Joseph engages in call-and-response phrases. During the breakdown, he sings in a manner shifting between his regular voice and a falsetto. The song builds over time, culminating in a towering climax which has Joseph's vocals emphatically soaring. The musical arrangement closes with a piano-driven conclusion.

The lyrical content of "Ride" speaks about going with the flow and is home to idioms as well as an ominous message. Despite its upbeat atmosphere, the song harbors melancholic rumination concerning the human condition. Joseph's apprehensive lyrics address millennial angst while discussing relatable life struggles. While he tries to relax and feel confident about his accomplishments, Joseph's mind digresses on who or what he'd die for and what is truly important in life. At one point, he proclaims, "Yeah I think about the end just way too much/But it's fun to fantasize." The song's chorus has Joseph elongating its syllables and shouting his lines: "Oh, I'm falling, so I'm taking my time on my ride." He sings poignant lyrics with a hint of darkness that have him confessing, "I've been thinking too much/help me."

== Critical reception ==
Billboard's Garrett Kamps favorably compared "Ride" to the work of Jamaican sound engineer King Tubby. Gab Ginsberg, from the same publication, called the single "irresistible." Erik Leijon of Montreal Gazette described "Ride" as "impossibly catchy faux-reggae." Jason Pettigrew from Alternative Press claimed it "might be the most happiest song in TOP's songbook, and there's still an ominous message." Mitchell Hillman for Phoenix New Times remarked that the song "is pushed even further into a blissful realm by Joseph's supersonic rapping." Chelsea Deeley from Music Feeds praised the vocal parts Tyler Joseph contributed to the song, writing that it "showcases a succinct vocal delivery that can go from rapping to balladry to screaming in a heartbeat and flourish with complete satisfaction to the ears." Kerrang's Sam Law described "Ride" by saying, "Ostensibly the most upbeat track in the twenty one pilots back-catalogue... Wearing its rich reggae influence on its (short) sleeve, luxuriating in a deep well of Caribbean-kissed riffage and shimmering synth-work, it introduced newcomers to another infectious facet of their sound." Anne Nickoloff and Troy Smith for The Plain Dealer considered the single "a hodgepodge of everything the band does best." Conversely, George Palathingal for The Sydney Morning Herald claimed, "'Ride, meanwhile, proves an equal-opportunity offender to fans of dub, hip-hop and rock." Likewise, Philip Cosores from Consequence of Sound questioned, "Is this the future of rock? A little hip-hop, a little dub, a little aggravating, and a lotta catchy?" He concludes, "'Ride' represents the worst-case scenario for Twenty One Pilots — a musical cornucopia that lacks for good taste."

== Commercial performance ==
The song peaked at number 5 on the Billboard Hot 100 on the chart dating September 10, 2016. It also reached number 1 on the Hot Rock Songs, Mainstream Top 40, and Alternative Songs charts, number 4 on the Adult Top 40 chart and number 5 on the Hot Dance Airplay chart. The former ranking, coupled with "Heathens" positioned at number 4 made Twenty One Pilots the third rock act with simultaneous top five Hot 100 singles in the chart's 58-year history, following only the Beatles and Elvis Presley, making them the first act in 47 years to achieve this milestone. It is the duo's third highest ranking single to date, behind "Stressed Out" and "Heathens". "Ride" has also reached the top 20 in various other countries, including Australia, Canada, Slovakia and France.

As of December 2016, "Ride" had sold over 1.2 million copies in the US.

== Music video ==
The music video for "Ride" demonstrates a stark contrast of a performance within a forest, abruptly transitioning from the dark to daylight. It showcases Tyler Joseph playing bass guitar wearing white-rimmed sunglasses while Josh Dun performs on drums. The white-rimmed pair of sunglasses seen in the video for "Ride" have since become part of Joseph's signature attire. The video, as of November 2025, has over 1.6 billion views on YouTube.

=== Reception ===
Rachel Campbell from Alternative Press commented, "While this track instrumentally gives off an upbeat, reggae vibe, the video for it is anything but, showing a stark contrast of a forest performance in the dark and in daylight. The one unique thing about it is Joseph plays bass, a talent minimally showcased in their live performances as he normally runs, crashes and dances across the stage while Josh Dun holds it down on the drums." Writing for the same publication, Jessica Bridgeman complimented Joseph's stylish fashion sense, saying, "Who needs boring Aviators when you can step out in some statement shades, à la Tyler?" The music video for the single "Ride" has since surpassed a billion views on YouTube. Although this is not the first time Twenty One Pilots have achieved such a feat, it still remains an uncommon figure for rock and metal bands to reach. In modern times, only the band Linkin Park alongside the duo's videos for "Heathens" and "Stressed Out" have experienced similar success and broken the barrier.

== Live performances ==
Twenty One Pilots performed "Ride" during a concert held at Comerica Theatre in Downtown Phoenix, Arizona. For the performance, Tyler Joseph picked up and played a bass guitar. Their rendition close with Josh Dun's drum kit being brought into the pit while a crowd of fans kept him afloat.

With the lower half of their faces half-covered in balaclava, Twenty One Pilots provided a live performance of "Ride" during a concert at UNSW Roundhouse in Sydney, Australia on April 20, 2016.

They performed the song an at the Forum in Inglewood, California during their Emotional Roadshow World Tour. After drummer Josh Dun played a cover version of "My Heart Will Go On" by Céline Dion on trumpet, the duo segued into a performance of "Ride." It was accompanied by a visual set change, with the stage suddenly becoming crowded by nine additional musicians from their two opening acts as Dun played drums on a platform held afloat by fans in the pit. While still on the tour the duo provided a live rendition at the Honda Center in Anaheim on February 15, 2017. The concert was a spectacle, featuring two stages and a giant hamster ball.

The band provided a live rendition of "Ride" during a concert at Bell Centre on May 22, 2019. After starting their show with a performance of "Holding On to You," they segued into a live rendition "Ride." The audience participated in a singalong during their performance.

== Track listing ==
Digital download / stream
| No. | Title | Length |
|---|---|---|
| 1. | "Ride" | 3:34 |

CD single
| No. | Title | Length |
|---|---|---|
| 1. | "Ride" | 3:34 |
| 2. | "Ride" (MSTR Rogers remix) |

== Personnel ==
Twenty One Pilots

- Tyler Joseph – vocals, programming, organ
- Josh Dun – drums

Additional personnel

- Ricky Reed – programming, bass
- Joe Viers – engineer
- Drew Kapner – engineer
- Alex Gruszecki – assistant engineer
- Neal Avron – mixing engineer
- Scott Skrzynski – assistant mix engineer
- Chris Gehringer – mastering engineer

== Charts ==
=== Weekly charts ===
| Chart (2016) | Peak position |
|---|---|
| Australia (ARIA) | 18 |
| Austria (Ö3 Austria Top 40) | 7 |
| Belgium (Ultratop 50 Flanders) | 12 |
| Belgium (Ultratop 50 Wallonia) | 7 |
| Canada Hot 100 (Billboard) | 13 |
| Canada AC (Billboard) | 27 |
| Canada CHR/Top 40 (Billboard) | 8 |
| Canada Hot AC (Billboard) | 15 |
| Canada Rock (Billboard) | 8 |
| Czech Republic Airplay (ČNS IFPI) | 12 |
| Czech Republic Singles Digital (ČNS IFPI) | 10 |
| Denmark (Tracklisten) | 40 |
| France (SNEP) | 12 |
| Germany (GfK) | 21 |
| Guatemala (Monitor Latino) | 17 |
| Hungary (Stream Top 40) | 23 |
| Ireland (IRMA) | 38 |
| Italy (FIMI) | 23 |
| Latvia (Latvijas Top 40) | 3 |
| Lebanon (Lebanese Top 20) | 12 |
| Mexico (Monitor Latino) | 6 |
| Mexico Ingles Airplay (Billboard) | 1 |
| Netherlands (Dutch Top 40) | 33 |
| Netherlands (Single Top 100) | 33 |
| New Zealand (Recorded Music NZ) | 10 |
| Norway (VG-lista) | 25 |
| Portugal (AFP) | 22 |
| Scottish Singles Sales (Official Charts) | 76 |
| Slovakia Airplay (ČNS IFPI) | 54 |
| Slovakia Singles Digital (ČNS IFPI) | 15 |
| Spain (Promusicae) | 31 |
| Sweden (Sverigetopplistan) | 50 |
| Switzerland (Schweizer Hitparade) | 22 |
| UK Singles (Official Charts) | 47 |
| US Billboard Hot 100 | 5 |
| US Adult Contemporary (Billboard) | 16 |
| US Adult Pop Airplay (Billboard) | 4 |
| US Dance Airplay (Billboard) | 3 |
| US Hot Rock & Alternative Songs (Billboard) | 1 |
| US Pop Airplay (Billboard) | 1 |
| US Rock & Alternative Airplay (Billboard) | 2 |
| Venezuela (National-Report) | 42 |

=== Year-end charts ===
| Chart (2015) | Position |
|---|---|
| US Hot Rock Songs (Billboard) | 30 |

| Chart (2016) | Position |
|---|---|
| Argentina (Monitor Latino) | 40 |
| Australia (ARIA) | 71 |
| Austria (Ö3 Austria Top 40) | 29 |
| Belgium (Ultratop Flanders) | 54 |
| Belgium (Ultratop Wallonia) | 41 |
| Canada (Canadian Hot 100) | 28 |
| France (SNEP) | 29 |
| Germany (Official German Charts) | 73 |
| Italy (FIMI) | 50 |
| Netherlands (Single Top 100) | 90 |
| New Zealand (Recorded Music NZ) | 40 |
| Spain (PROMUSICAE) | 82 |
| Switzerland (Schweizer Hitparade) | 58 |
| US Billboard Hot 100 | 20 |
| US Adult Contemporary (Billboard) | 42 |
| US Adult Top 40 (Billboard) | 13 |
| US Hot Rock Songs (Billboard) | 2 |
| US Mainstream Top 40 (Billboard) | 9 |
| US Rock Airplay (Billboard) | 6 |

| Chart (2017) | Position |
|---|---|
| France (SNEP) | 146 |
| US Hot Rock Songs (Billboard) | 6 |

=== Decade-end charts ===
| Chart (2010–2019) | Position |
|---|---|
| US Hot Rock Songs (Billboard) | 9 |

== Certifications ==
| Region | Certification | Certified units/sales |
|---|---|---|
| Australia (ARIA) | 4× Platinum | 280,000^{‡} |
| Austria (IFPI Austria) | 3× Platinum | 90,000^{‡} |
| Belgium (BRMA) | Platinum | 20,000^{‡} |
| Canada (Music Canada) | 9× Platinum | 720,000^{‡} |
| Denmark (IFPI Danmark) | Platinum | 90,000^{‡} |
| France (SNEP) | Diamond | 333,333^{‡} |
| Germany (BVMI) | Platinum | 400,000^{‡} |
| Italy (FIMI) | 3× Platinum | 150,000^{‡} |
| Netherlands (NVPI) | Platinum | 93,000^{‡} |
| New Zealand (RMNZ) | 5× Platinum | 150,000^{‡} |
| Norway (IFPI Norway) | Platinum | 40,000^{‡} |
| Poland (ZPAV) | Diamond | 100,000^{‡} |
| Portugal (AFP) | 2× Platinum | 20,000^{‡} |
| Spain (Promusicae) | 2× Platinum | 120,000^{‡} |
| Sweden (GLF) | Platinum | 40,000^{‡} |
| Switzerland (IFPI Switzerland) | Platinum | 30,000^{‡} |
| United Kingdom (BPI) | 2× Platinum | 1,200,000^{‡} |
| United States (RIAA) | Diamond | 10,000,000^{‡} |
^{‡} Sales+streaming figures based on certification alone.

== Release history ==
| Region | Date | Format | Label |
|---|---|---|---|
| Worldwide | May 11, 2015 | Digital download (promotional single); stream | Fueled by Ramen |
| United States | April 12, 2016 | Contemporary hit radio | Fueled by Ramen |

== See also ==
- List of Hot Rock & Alternative Songs number ones
- List of Billboard Mainstream Top 40 number-one songs of 2016
- List of highest-certified digital singles in the United States
