= Fairly Local =

Twenty One Pilots song

Single by Twenty One Pilots

from the album Blurryface
- Released: March 17, 2015
- Recorded: 2014
- Genre: Hip hop; electronica; synth-rock; drumstep; trip hop
- Length: 3:27
- Label: Fueled by Ramen
- Songwriter: Tyler Joseph
- Producer: Ricky Reed

Twenty One Pilots singles chronology
"Car Radio" (2014)	"Fairly Local" (2015)	"Tear in My Heart" (2015)

Music video
- "Fairly Local" on YouTube

"Fairly Local" is a song written and recorded by American musical duo Twenty One Pilots. It was released as the lead single from their fourth studio album Blurryface (2015) on March 17, 2015, with its music video having been released the previous day. The song was their first to chart on the Billboard Hot 100, peaking at number 84, and has since been certified platinum in the United States.

== Background ==
"Fairly Local" served as the lead single of Blurryface, and was an introductory track to the titular character. Its two verses are written to contradict each other almost word for word, creating a duality in Joseph's personality between himself and the alter ego "Blurryface", represented in the second refrain through the use of a vocoder, a reprise of the original refrain with deepened pitch.

The song describes and recounts Joseph's experiences with troubled fans while touring for Vessel, the third studio album, stating in an interview with Paper:

"I guess there's always that fear that you're going to change as a person. But also, whether or not you're in the spotlight making music, you're going to change too. I mean, Josh and I are right now sitting in Columbus, Ohio, at my house and we love it here. It's our hometown and it always will be. So I think in the song "Fairly Local," it's more metaphorical. We had a lot of conversations with a lot of people who like listening to music or using music to get through tough times. If anything, I think Josh and I learned when we were traveling the world during the last album cycle that everyone's the same, everyone feels the same issues. So it's kind of a way of getting on the same level as these people and telling them, in a sense, we understand what you're going through."

"Fairly Local" makes references to mainstream radio play extensively. In an interview with Radio.com, Joseph explained, "We understand that there's a certain type of song that is aerodynamic enough to be on the radio. A lot of people would say that that's a good song. I guess we thought, man, do we have to write a record that has a bunch of songs that fall into what would be considered a radio song? That was something that I was kind of working through. Now I understand all these rules cause we've been around it one time. Do I have to obey them completely or can I just continue writing the way that I've always written? So, no, we're not rebellious about it. We don't think that the radio sucks or whatever. It was just something that we had to get off our chest."

Within the song, the fourth wall is broken as Joseph references the band's listeners, coining "the few, the proud, the emotional", later becoming a collective term for Twenty One Pilots fans.

== Composition ==
"Fairly Local" is an electronic rock and drumstep song that runs for three minutes and twenty-seven seconds, featuring hip hop and pop rap influences. The song alters between sparse verse instrumentation, electronic breakdowns in the choruses, and an ambient instrumental bridge. This gives "Fairly Local" a distinct sound described as intense and eerie. According to the sheet music published at Musicnotes.com by Alfred Music, it is written in the time signature of common time at a tempo of 115 beats per minute. "Fairly Local" is composed in the key of F♯ minor, while Joseph's vocal range spans two octaves, from a low C♯_{3} to a high of C♯_{5}.

== Music video ==
The music video for "Fairly Local" was uploaded on YouTube without prior notice one day before the song's release as a single, and was directed by Mark C. Eshleman of Reel Bear Media. The video is shot in a dark, snow filled and presumably abandoned building, with Dun playing the drums in a large room and Joseph singing in various rooms of the building throughout the video. "Fairly Local" introduces the black paint on Joseph's hands and neck, which symbolise the presence of Blurryface. As the video progresses, Joseph's movements become increasingly more frantic and erratic, while Dun's drums fly into the air and disappear, one by one.

== Track listing ==
Digital download / stream
No.	Title	Length
1.	"Fairly Local"	3:27

CD single
No.	Title	Length
1.	"Fairly Local"	3:27
2.	"Fairly Local" (instrumental)	3:27
3.	"Fairly Local" (radio edit)	3:25
4.	"Fairly Local" (TV track)	3:27

== Personnel ==
Twenty One Pilots

- Tyler Joseph – lead vocals, programming, executive production
- Josh Dun – drums, electronic drums

Additional musicians

- Ricky Reed – bass guitar, programming, production

== Charts ==
=== Peak positions ===
Chart (2015–16)	Peak position
US Billboard Hot 100	84
US Digital Songs (Billboard)	26
US Hot Rock & Alternative Songs (Billboard)	8
US Rock Digital Songs (Billboard)	4

=== Year-end charts ===
Chart (2015)	Position
US Billboard Hot Rock Songs	49

== Certifications ==
Region	Certification	Certified units/sales
Australia (ARIA)	Gold	35,000^{‡}
Canada (Music Canada)	Gold	40,000^{‡}
New Zealand (RMNZ)	Gold	15,000^{‡}
Poland (ZPAV)	Platinum	20,000^{‡}
United Kingdom (BPI)	Silver	200,000^{‡}
United States (RIAA)	Platinum	1,000,000^{‡}
^{‡} Sales+streaming figures based on certification alone.

== Release history ==
Region	Date	Format	Label
Worldwide	March 17, 2015	Digital download; stream	Fueled by Ramen
