= List of songs recorded by Twenty One Pilots =

List of songs recorded by musical duo Twenty One Pilots

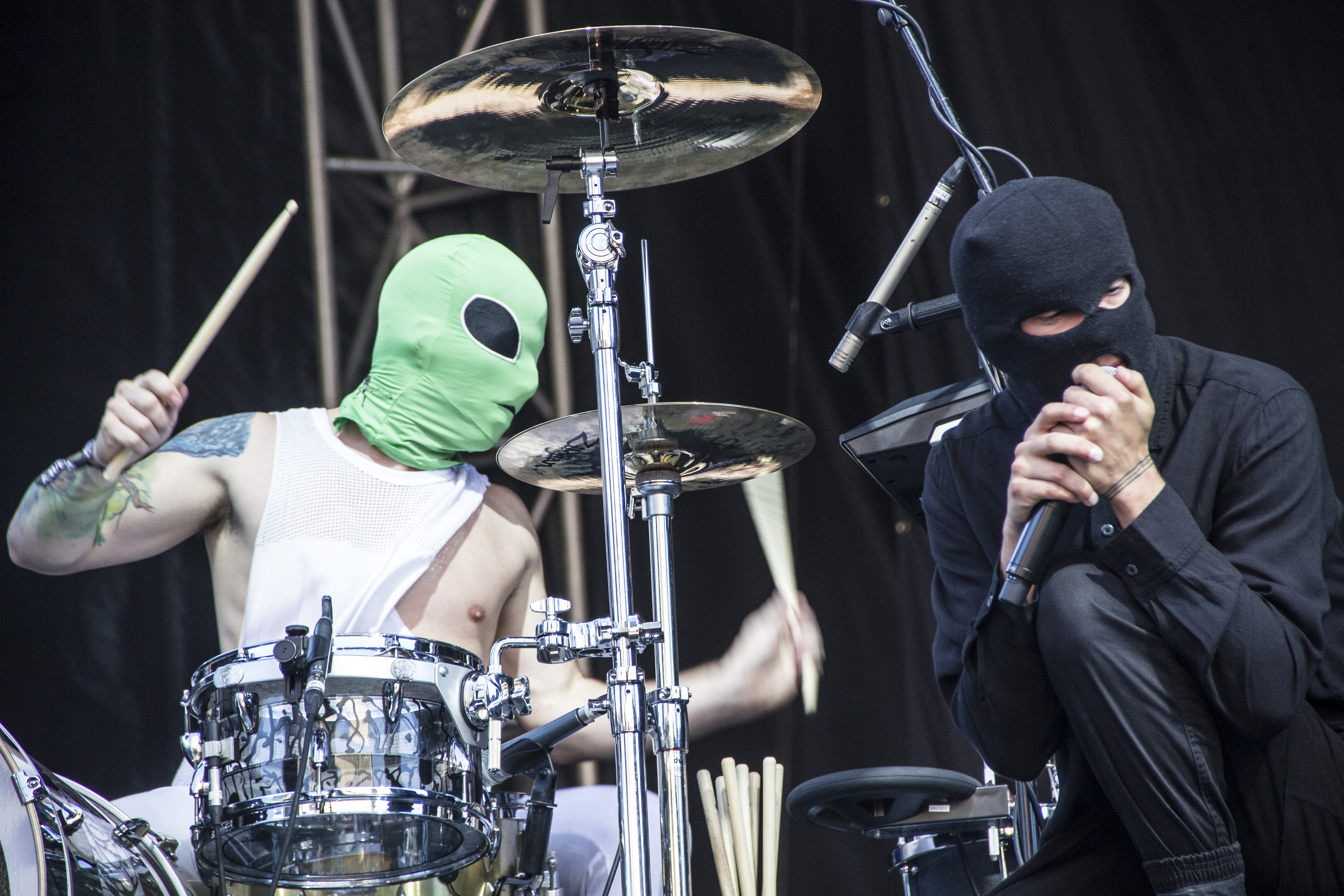
Twenty One Pilots performing in 2014

Twenty One Pilots have eight studio albums, with the most recent one being Breach, released in September 2025. While the original line-up had included bassist Nick Thomas and drummer Chris Salih, Josh Dun replaced Salih on drums and percussion in 2011, and remains the only other member of the band aside from frontman Tyler Joseph.

A list of albums by Twenty One Pilots and their respective chart listings can be found on the Twenty One Pilots discography article.

== Songs recorded and released by Twenty One Pilots ==
Name	Length	Release	Year	Notes
"Addict with a Pen"	4:47	Twenty One Pilots	2009	
"Air Catcher" "Air Catcher (Studio Version)"	4:13 3:55	Twenty One Pilots Website	2009 2011	Air Catcher was first released on a demo CD which was distributed to attendees at a "Battle of the Bands" event on November 10, 2009. Over a month later, the song would appear on the band's debut album.; The version that appears on the demo CD is slightly different than the one released on Twenty One Pilots.; Online uploads of the "Studio Version" are usually given de facto titles like "Alternate Version" or "Alternative Version"; however, the file name titles it as "Air Catcher (Studio Version)".; The studio version was recorded after Twenty One Pilots and before Regional at Best.; It has also been erroneously stated that the track was never released by the band; however, in 2011, Twenty One Pilots uploaded "Air Catcher (Studio Version)" to their website for free download, amongst other tracks. The other tracks that were made available were: the band's cover of "Jar of Hearts"; "Time to Say Goodbye", a single; and "Slowtown", "Car Radio", and "Trees", which would eventually appear on the Regional at Best album.
"Anathema"	3:59	Regional at Best	2011	Some lyrics are derived from the song "Blasphemy" off of Joseph's solo-album No Phun Intended
"At the Risk of Feeling Dumb"	3:23	Clancy	2024	
"Backslide"	3:00	Clancy	2024	Single
"Bandito"	5:31	Trench	2018	
"Be Concerned" (featuring Jocef)	4:08	Regional at Best	2011	
"Before You Start Your Day"	3:53	Twenty One Pilots	2009	
"Bounce Man"	3:05	Scaled and Icy	2021	
"Can't Help Falling in Love" (Cover)	2:55 (YouTube) 2:39 (Studio version)	YouTube Holding On to You (EP)	2012	Elvis Presley cover
"Cancer" (Cover)	3:56	Rock Sound Presents: The Black Parade	2016	My Chemical Romance cover; Promotional single
"Car Radio"	5:14 4:27	Regional at Best Vessel	2011 2013	Re-recorded for Vessel album; Single
"A Car, a Torch, a Death"	4:34	Twenty One Pilots	2009	
"Center Mass"	3:48	Breach	2025	
"Chlorine" "Chlorine (Mexico City)"	5:24 3:59	Trench Location Sessions	2018 2019	Single; "Chlorine (Alternative Mix)" is a shorter version of the song released for radio play. This version lacks the outro heard in the original version. The track length decreased from 5:24 to 3:11.; Before its name was simplified to "Chlorine (Mexico City)", the track's full title was, "Chlorine (19.4326° N, 99.1332° W)". Unlike the other Location Sessions, the origin of this recording or performance is unknown but is presumed to have been at a private concert at the title's coordinates in Mexico City.
"Choker"	3:43	Scaled and Icy	2021	Single
"Christmas Saves the Year"	3:32	Christmas Saves the Year	2020	An original Christmas song recorded in Joseph's home studio.
"City Walls"	5:22	Breach	2025	
"Clear"	3:39	Regional at Best	2011	
"The Contract"	3:48	Breach	2025	Single
"Cottonwood"	3:08	Breach	2025	
"The Craving"	2:54	Clancy	2024	Single; There are two versions of "The Craving", the "(Single Version)" and "(Jenna's Version)", they are instrumentally different. An acoustic version of the track was played by the duo at a live show in London in early May 2024, before it was officially released.
"Cut My Lip" "Cut My Lip (Brooklyn)"	4:43 4:19	Trench Location Sessions	2018 2019	"Cut My Lip (Brooklyn)" is a live version of the song (performed alongside other "re-imagined" versions of "Ride", "Smithereens", "Chlorine", and "My Blood"). The video of the private Brooklyn concert can be found on Entercom's YouTube channel. Of the five songs Joseph reconstructed live, "Cut My Lip" was chosen to be mastered and re-uploaded to the band's platforms as the second installation of the Location Sessions.; Before its name was simplified to "Cut My Lip (Brooklyn)", the track's full title was, "Cut My Lip (40.6782°N, 73.9442° W)".
"Days Lie Dormant"	3:26	Breach	2025	
"Doubt" "Doubt (demo)"	3:11 2:57	Blurryface YouTube	2015 2025	Demo track released ahead of Blurryface's 10th anniversary.
"Downstairs"	5:26	Breach	2025	
"Drag Path"	3:44	Breach: Digital Remains	2026	Originally unreleased and only available as part of the Digital Remains purchase package for Breach. An edited-down version of the song was later released on February 17, 2026 alongside a music video.
"Drum Show"	3:23	Breach	2025	Single
"Fairly Local"	3:27	Blurryface	2015	Single
"Fake You Out"	3:51	Vessel	2013	Single
"Fall Away"	3:02	Twenty One Pilots	2009	Some lyrics are derived from the song "Drown" off of Joseph's solo-album No Phun Intended
"Forest"	4:06	Regional at Best	2011	On May 18, 2011, an excerpt of the song was released in the form of a YouTube video directed by Mark C. Eshelman, before Regional at Best. In the video's title slide, the song's title is spelled "Forrest". This could have been the title of the song before its official release, or it could have been a simple typo.
"Formidable"	2:56	Scaled and Icy	2021	
"Friend, Please"	4:13	Twenty One Pilots	2009	
"Garbage"	3:16	Breach	2025	
"Glowing Eyes"	4:19	Regional at Best	2011	The song features guest vocals James Truslow of the band Truslow.
"Goner"	2:07 3:56	YouTube Blurryface	2012 2015	Theorized to appear on Joseph's self-released album No Phun Intended; Solo-released as a video on the official Twenty One Pilots YouTube channel; Interestingly, the 2012 performance ends with the same sound effect that begins "Heavydirtysoul," the first track off of Twenty One Pilots' Blurryface. Furthermore, the re-recorded version of "Goner" is the final track on Blurryface.; Re-recorded for Blurryface
"Good Day"	3:24	Scaled and Icy	2021	
"Guns for Hands"	4:37 4:32	Regional at Best Vessel	2011 2013	Re-recorded for Vessel album; Single
"Heathens"	3:15	Suicide Squad: The Album	2016	Single
"Heavydirtysoul"	3:54	Blurryface	2015	Single; Some lyrics are derived from Joseph's "Street Poetry" video
"Holding On to You"	4:26 4:23	Regional at Best Vessel	2011 2013	Re-recorded for Vessel album; Single
"Hometown"	3:54	Blurryface	2015	
"House of Gold"	2:43	Regional at Best Vessel	2011 2013	Released via newsletter; Single; Re-recorded for Vessel album
"The Hype" "The Hype (Berlin)"	4:25 4:10	Trench Location Sessions	2018 2019	Single; "The Hype (Alternative Mix)", a shorter version of the song, was released for radio play. The track length decreased from 4:25 to 3:23.; "The Hype (Berlin)" is the third and final installment of the Location Sessions. Unlike its two predecessors, which initially featured coordinates in their titles, this session was not assigned coordinates in its title, and is simply "The Hype (Berlin)". The titles of the other Location Sessions have since been shortened, as well.; The recording process for the reimagined version was filmed and released on the duo's YouTube channel.
"Implicit Demand for Proof"	4:52	Twenty One Pilots	2009	
"Intentions"	2:15	Breach	2025	
"Isle of Flightless Birds"	5:46	Twenty One Pilots	2009	
"Jar of Hearts" (Cover)	4:00	YouTube	2011	Christina Perri cover
"Johnny Boy"	4:39	Twenty One Pilots	2009	
"The Judge"	4:57	Blurryface	2015	
"Jumpsuit"	3:59	Trench	2018	Single
"Kitchen Sink" (featuring Zack Joseph)	5:34	Regional at Best	2011	
"Lane Boy"	4:13	Blurryface	2015	Single
"Lavish"	2:38	Clancy	2024	
"Leave the City"	4:40	Trench	2018	
"Legend"	2:53	Trench	2018	A portion of the song was leaked on September 29, 2018.
"Level of Concern" "Level of Concern (live from outside)"	3:40 3:42	Level of Concern Location Sessions	2020	The single and respective music video were released during the coronavirus pandemic.; "Level of Concern" was reimagined and performed "live from outside" for The Tonight Show: At Home Edition.; "Level of Concern (live from outside)" was eventually released independently alongside the original version.
"Levitate"	2:25	Trench	2018	Single
"Lovely"	4:20 4:18	Regional at Best Vessel	2011 2013	The re-recorded version of "Lovely" is available on UK/EU and Japanese Special Edition bonus track versions of the Vessel album; Single
"Mad World" (Cover)	1:45	YouTube	2014	Tears for Fears cover
"March to the Sea"	5:32	Twenty One Pilots	2009	
"Message Man"	4:00	Blurryface	2015	
"Midwest Indigo"	3:16	Clancy	2024	
"Migraine"	3:59	Vessel	2013	Promotional single
"Morph"	4:19	Trench	2018	
"Mulberry Street"	3:44	Scaled and Icy	2021	
"My Blood"	3:49	Trench	2018	Single
"Navigating"	3:43	Clancy	2024	The track ends as "Next Semester" begins, as depicted in the latter's music video.
"Neon Gravestones"	4:00	Trench	2018	
"Never Take It"	3:32	Scaled and Icy	2021	
"Next Semester"	3:54	Clancy	2024	Single
"Nico and the Niners"	3:47	Trench	2018	Single
"No Chances"	3:46	Scaled and Icy	2021	
"Not Today"	3:58	Blurryface	2015	
"Ode to Sleep"	5:14 5:08	Regional at Best Vessel	2011 2013	Some lyrics are derived from the song "Just Like Yesterday" off of Joseph's solo-album No Phun Intended; Re-recorded for Vessel album; During the Quiet Is Violent World Tour, the song would often begin with a brief poem called "Only Skeleton Bones Remain".; Promotional single
"Oh, Ms. Believer"	3:37	Twenty One Pilots	2009	
"Oldies Station"	3:48	Clancy	2024	
"One Way"	2:43	Breach	2025	
"Overcompensate"	3:56	Clancy	2024	Single
"The Outside"	3:36	Scaled and Icy	2021	Single
"The Pantaloon"	3:32	Twenty One Pilots	2009	
"Paladin Strait"	6:28	Clancy	2024	
"Pet Cheetah"	3:18	Trench	2018	
"Polarize"	3:46	Blurryface	2015	
"Rawfear"	3:22	Breach	2025	
"Redecorate"	4:05	Scaled and Icy	2021	
"Ride"	3:34	Blurryface	2015	Single
"Robot Voices"	3:57	Breach	2025	
"Routines in the Night"	3:22	Clancy	2024	
"Ruby"	4:30	Regional at Best	2011	
"Saturday"	2:52	Scaled and Icy	2021	Single
"Save"	4:02	Website	2010	"Save" originally appears on Joseph's No Phun Intended, but was re-recorded as a single.; The re-recorded version contains stronger electric guitar and drumming, and was released to the band's website for download in 2010, but has since been taken down.
"Screen"	3:49	Vessel	2013	
"Semi-Automatic"	4:14	Vessel	2013	
"Shy Away"	2:55	Scaled and Icy	2021	Single
"Slowtown"	4:57	Regional at Best	2011	
"Smithereens"	2:57	Trench	2018	
"Snap Back"	3:30	Clancy	2024	
"Stressed Out"	3:22	Blurryface	2015	Single
"The Run and Go"	3:51	Vessel	2013	
"Tally"	3:32	Breach	2025	
"Taxi Cab"	4:46	Twenty One Pilots	2009	
"Tear in My Heart"	3:08	Blurryface	2015	Single
"Time to Say Goodbye"	3:15	MySpace	2009	Samples Andrea Bocelli and Sarah Brightman's Con te partirò (also known as "Time to Say Goodbye"). The song is not to be confused for a cover, as most of the lyrics are Joseph's. The song was originally going to be included on the first full album, but was ultimately pulled due to copyright issues.; "Time to Say Goodbye" was originally released on an early self-produced demo CD alongside "Johnny Boy," "Air Catcher," and "Friend, Please," before Twenty One Pilots was released. The CD was handed out on November 10, 2009, at a "Battle of The Bands" performance.; The song was released along with an early version of Trees as a free download on the band's MySpace page on December 31, 2009, two days after the release of Twenty One Pilots.; This is the first song Twenty One Pilots drummer Josh Dun heard from the original lineup, leading him to converse with Tyler Joseph and ultimately leading to his current position.; This song was the band's last release during the time founding band members Thomas and Salih were in the band.
"Trapdoor"	4:37	Twenty One Pilots	2009	
"Trees"	4:20 4:27	Regional at Best Vessel	2011 2013	Theorized to appear on Joseph's self-released album No Phun Intended; Re-recorded for Vessel album
"Truce"	2:22	Vessel	2013	
"Two"	3:05	Regional at Best	2011	Released via newsletter
"The Line"	3:12	Arcane League of Legends: Season 2	2024	Announced initially as a cryptic image posted on Twitter/X, it was confirmed in September 2024 that Twenty One Pilots would record "The Line" as part of a setlist of the upcoming soundtrack for the second season of League of Legends adult-animated adaptation series Arcane.
"Vignette"	3:22	Clancy	2024	
"We Don't Believe What's on TV"	2:57	Blurryface	2015	

== Unreleased songs recorded by Twenty One Pilots ==
While the following songs bear no official titles, they have been given de facto names by the fandom.
Title	Year	Notes	References
"I Need Something"	2011	Featured as background music in a video released to the Twenty One Pilots YouTube channel. The video is entitled "twenty one pilots: Regional at Best Tour Part 01 (Episode 06 - Regional at Best: The Web Series)". The song is also known as "I Need Something (To Kill Me)."; The full version of "I Need Something (to Kill Me)" appears on the Level of Concern Alternate Reality Game flash drive gifted to early winners of the game. The track's filename was "webseries001". The full version surfaced in November 2020.	
"Korea (Demo)"	2012	Later reworked on the song "Downstairs" from Twenty One Pilots' 2025 album Breach.	
"Screen (Demo)"	2012		
"Untitled Demo 2011"	2011		
"Untitled Demo 2013"	2013		

=== Level of Concern Alternate Reality Game flash drive ===
In 2020, Twenty One Pilots launched the Level of Concern Alternate Reality Game, and the first 500 individuals to successfully complete it were gifted a flash drive containing exclusive images, videos, and unreleased demo tracks from 2011.

All of the tracks were eventually leaked to YouTube, many of which had never been heard before. Most of the audio files lack vocals. The folder the tracks were in was titled "Old Demos 2011." The filenames of the tracks are as follows: "bellkit.mp3", "Blue Score 002.wav", "Classic.mp3", "Creepy.mp3", "Disco.mp3", "pianobeat.mp3", "Regg.mp3", "Techno2.mp3", "webseries001.wav", "webseries002.wav", "webseries003.wav", "webseries004.wav", "webseries005.wav", and "webseries006.wav".

The track "Blue Score 002" has been used as filler music for the Emotional Roadshow World Tour.

== See also ==
- Twenty One Pilots
- Twenty One Pilots discography
- Tyler Joseph discography
