= Twenty One Pilots discography =

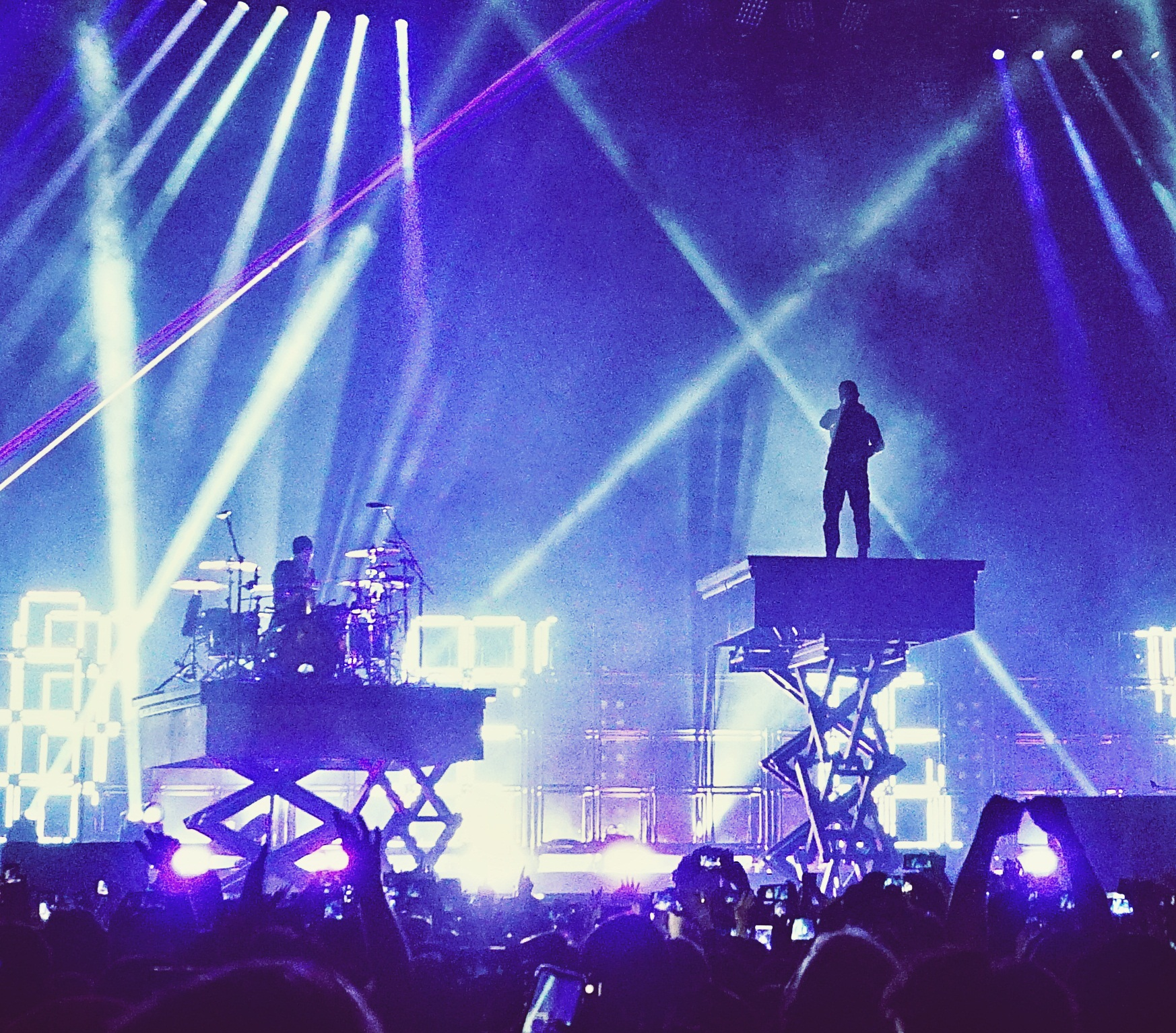
- Twenty One Pilots performing in 2019
- Studio albums: 8
- EPs: 9
- Live albums: 6
- Compilation albums: 1
- Singles: 35
- Music videos: 57
- Promotional singles: 7

American musical duo Twenty One Pilots have released eight studio albums, six live albums, one compilation album, 10 extended plays, 35 singles, seven promotional singles, and 57 music videos. The band was formed in 2009 and currently consists of Tyler Joseph and Josh Dun. After two self-released albums, Twenty One Pilots in 2009 and Regional at Best in 2011, they were signed by Fueled by Ramen in 2012, which released their following studio albums, as well as Blurryface Live, a three-LP, tri-gatefold picture disc vinyl, Scaled and Icy (Livestream Version) and MTV Unplugged.

The duo achieved breakthrough success with their fourth album Blurryface in 2015, which produced the successful singles "Stressed Out" and "Ride". In addition, the single "Heathens", recorded for the soundtrack of the film Suicide Squad, made the group the first alternative artist to have two concurrent top ten singles in the United States.

The duo's fifth studio album, Trench, was released on October 5, 2018, followed by their sixth, Scaled and Icy, on May 21, 2021, and their seventh, Clancy, released on May 24, 2024. They are the first and currently only artist in history to have each song from two separate studio albums (Vessel and Blurryface) certified at least gold by the RIAA. They have won a Grammy Award for Best Pop Duo/Group Performance, and Joseph has been nominated for six Grammy Awards in total. Their eighth album, Breach, was released on September 12, 2025, and achieved their biggest opening sales week to date.

== Albums ==
=== Studio albums ===
List of studio albums, with selected chart positions
Title	Album details	Peak chart positions										Sales	Certifications
Title	Album details	US	AUS	BEL	CAN	FIN	IRL	NLD	NZ	SWE	UK	Sales	Certifications
Twenty One Pilots	Released: December 29, 2009; Label: Self-released; Format: CD, DL	139	—	—	—	—	—	—	—	—	— (Note: Twenty One Pilots did not enter the UK Albums Chart, but peaked at number 49 on the Independent Albums Chart.)	US: 115,000	RIAA: Gold
Regional at Best	Released: July 8, 2011; Label: Self-released; Format: CD, DL	—	—	—	—	—	—	—	—	—	—	US: 3,000	
Vessel	Released: January 8, 2013; Label: Fueled by Ramen (531792); Format: CD, CS, DL, LP	21	51	95	29	49	24	53	16	60	39		RIAA: 2× Platinum; ARIA: Gold; BPI: Platinum; MC: 2× Platinum; NVPI: Gold; RMNZ: Platinum
Blurryface	Released: May 17, 2015; Label: Fueled by Ramen (548932); Format: CD, CS, DL, LP	1	7	17	4	5	7	18	2	9	5	US: 1,700,000; UK: 394,727	RIAA: 6× Platinum; ARIA: Platinum; BPI: 2× Platinum; IFPI SWE: Gold; MC: 6× Platinum; NVPI: Platinum; RMNZ: 5× Platinum
Trench	Released: October 5, 2018; Label: Fueled by Ramen; Format: CD, CS, DL, LP	2	1	7	2	2	2	1	1	5	2		RIAA: Platinum; ARIA: Gold; BPI: Gold; MC: Platinum; NVPI: Gold; RMNZ: Platinum
Scaled and Icy	Released: May 21, 2021; Label: Fueled by Ramen; Format: CD, CS, DL, LP	3	3	7	5	11	5	7	3	24	3	US: 51,000	RIAA: Gold; BPI: Silver; MC: Gold; NVPI: Platinum
Clancy	Released: May 24, 2024; Label: Fueled by Ramen; Format: CD, CS, DL, LP	3	1	4	3	20	3	2	3	—	2	US: 113,000	BPI: Gold
Breach	Released: September 12, 2025; Label: Fueled by Ramen; Format: CD, DL, LP	1	2	3	3	23	4	1	4	11	4		BPI: Silver
"—" denotes a recording that did not chart or was not released in that territory.

=== Live albums ===
List of live albums
Title	Album details	Peak chart positions							
Title	Album details	US	US Alt.	US Rock	AUS	BEL	NLD	NZ	UK
Live at UG Studios	Released: November 4, 2011; Release type: EP; Format: DL	—	—	—	—	—	—	—	—
Spotify Sessions	Released: June 18, 2013; Label: Fueled by Ramen; Format: DL	—	—	—	—	—	—	—	—
Blurryface Live	Released: November 25, 2016; Label: Fueled by Ramen; Format: LP	—	18	28	—	—	—	—	—
Scaled and Icy (Livestream Version)	Released: November 19, 2021; Label: Fueled by Ramen; Format: DL	—	—	—	—	—	—	—	—
MTV Unplugged	Released: April 21, 2023; Label: Fueled by Ramen; Format: CD, LP, DL	147	23	—	—	—	—	—	—
More Than We Ever Imagined (Live in Mexico City)	Released: August 7, 2026; Label: Fueled by Ramen; Format: CD, LP, DL	50	9	12	29	25	25	33	96
"—" denotes a recording that did not chart or was not released in that territory.

=== Compilation releases ===
List of compilation albums
Title	Album details
Level of Concern: USB 2.0	Released: October 2020 (Note: In 2020, Twenty One Pilots launched the Level of Concern Alternate Reality Game, and the first 500 individuals to successfully complete it were gifted a flash drive containing exclusive images, videos, and unreleased demo tracks from 2011. Music on the flash drive included "webseries001.wav", which had been known by fans as "I Need Something (To Kill Me)", and "Blue Score 002", used as filler music for the Emotional Roadshow World Tour.); Format: USB

== Extended plays ==
List of extended plays
Title	Extended play details	Peak chart positions		
Title	Extended play details	US	US Alt.	US Rock
Three Songs	Released: July 17, 2012; Label: Fueled by Ramen; Format: CD, DL	—	—	—
Migraine	Released: June 14, 2013; Label: Fueled by Ramen; Format: DL	—	—	—
Holding On to You (Note: In 2012, Twenty One Pilots covered "Can't Help Falling in Love" by Elvis Presley. Two versions of this rendition are known to exist. The first is a studio version that appears on the EP Holding On to You. The second version appears in the music video shot for the cover; this version incorporates elements performed live.)	Released: August 16, 2013; Label: Fueled by Ramen; Format: DL	—	—	—
Quiet Is Violent	Released: August 1, 2014; Label: Fueled by Ramen (7567867179); Format: CD, DL	—	—	—
The LC LP	Released: April 18, 2015; Label: Fueled by Ramen (548230); Format: 12-inch vinyl	—	—	—
Double Sided	Released: April 16, 2016; Label: Fueled by Ramen (554232–7); Format: 7-inch vinyl	—	—	—
TOPxMM (The Mutemath Sessions)	Released: December 19, 2016; Label: Self-released; Format: DL	161	11	12
Triplet EP	Released: October 5, 2018; Label: Fueled by Ramen; Format: 10-inch LP	—	—	—
Location Sessions	Released: June 12, 2021; Label: Fueled by Ramen; Format: 12-inch vinyl	186	24	39
"—" denotes a recording that did not chart or was not released in that territory.

== Singles ==
List of singles, with selected chart positions, showing year released and album name
Title	Year	Peak chart positions										Certifications	Album
Title	Year	US	US Alt.	US Rock	AUS	BEL	CAN	IRL	NZ	SWE	UK	Certifications	Album
"Holding On to You"	2012	—	10	33	—	— (Note: "Holding on to You" did not enter the Flemish Ultratop chart, but peaked at number 27 on the Ultratip chart.)	—	—	—	—	—	RIAA: 2× Platinum; ARIA: Gold; BPI: Silver	Vessel
"Guns for Hands"	2012	—	—	—	—	—	—	—	—	—	—	RIAA: Platinum	Vessel
"Lovely" (Note: "Lovely" appears on the UK/Europe and Japanese edition of Vessel (as well as its 2023 vinyl release) and also on the Blurryface Japanese edition.)	2013	—	—	—	—	—	—	—	—	—	—		Vessel
"House of Gold"	2013	—	10	38	—	—	—	—	—	—	—	RIAA: Platinum; ARIA: Gold; BPI: Silver; MC: Platinum; RMNZ: Gold	Vessel
"Fake You Out"	2013	—	—	—	—	—	—	—	—	—	—	RIAA: Gold	Vessel
"Car Radio"	2014	— (Note: "Car Radio" did not enter the Billboard Hot 100, but peaked at number 15 on the Bubbling Under Hot 100 chart.)	28	20	—	—	—	—	—	—	—	RIAA: 3× Platinum; ARIA: Platinum; BPI: Gold; MC: 2× Platinum; RMNZ: Platinum	Vessel
"Fairly Local"	2015	84	—	8	—	—	—	—	—	—	—	RIAA: Platinum; ARIA: Gold; BPI: Silver; MC: Gold; RMNZ: Gold	Blurryface
"Tear in My Heart"	2015	82	2	6	60	—	88	—	—	—	—	RIAA: 3× Platinum; ARIA: Platinum; BPI: Gold; MC: 3× Platinum; RMNZ: Platinum	Blurryface
"Lane Boy"	2015	—	—	28	—	—	—	—	—	—	—	RIAA: Platinum; ARIA: Gold; BPI: Silver; MC: Platinum; RMNZ: Platinum	Blurryface
"Stressed Out"	2015	2	1	1	2	3	3	5	5	9	12	RIAA: Diamond (13× Platinum); ARIA: 6× Platinum; BPI: 4× Platinum; BRMA: 2× Platinum; IFPI SWE: 4× Platinum; MC: Diamond; RMNZ: 7× Platinum	Blurryface
"Ride"	2016	5	1	1	18	7	13	38	10	50	47	RIAA: Diamond; ARIA: 4× Platinum; BPI: 2× Platinum; BRMA: Platinum; IFPI SWE: Platinum; MC: 9× Platinum; RMNZ: 5× Platinum	Blurryface
"Heathens"	2016	2	1	1	3	10	3	4	2	6	5	RIAA: Diamond (11× Platinum); ARIA: 6× Platinum; BPI: 3× Platinum; BRMA: Platinum; MC: Diamond; RMNZ: 4× Platinum	Suicide Squad: The Album
"Heavydirtysoul"	2016	— (Note: "Heavydirtysoul" did not enter the Billboard Hot 100, but peaked at number 25 on the Bubbling Under Hot 100 chart.)	2	8	—	42	— (Note: "Heavydirtysoul" did not enter the Canadian Hot 100 chart, but peaked at number 48 on the Canadian Digital Song Sales chart.)	—	—	—	—	RIAA: 2× Platinum; BPI: Gold; MC: 2× Platinum; RMNZ: Gold	Blurryface
"Jumpsuit"	2018	50	1	6	76	— (Note: "Jumpsuit" did not enter the Flemish Ultratop chart, but peaked at number 22 on the Ultratip chart.)	61	41	— (Note: "Jumpsuit" did not enter the NZ Top 40 Singles Chart, but peaked at number five on the NZ Hot Singles Chart.)	— (Note: "Jumpsuit" did not enter the Swedish Singellista Chart, but peaked at number 10 on the Swedish Heatseeker Chart.)	50	RIAA: Platinum; ARIA: Gold; BPI: Silver; MC: Platinum; RMNZ: Gold	Trench
"Nico and the Niners"	2018	79	—	7	133	—	— (Note: "Nico and the Niners" did not enter the Canadian Hot 100 chart, but peaked at number 38 on the Canadian Digital Song Sales chart.)	60	— (Note: "Nico and the Niners" did not enter the NZ Top 40 Singles Chart, but peaked at number seven on the NZ Hot Singles Chart.)	—	88	RIAA: Gold; RMNZ: Gold	Trench
"Levitate"	2018	—	—	11	—	—	—	—	— (Note: "Levitate" did not enter the NZ Top 40 Singles Chart, but peaked at number 15 on the NZ Hot Singles Chart.)	—	—	RIAA: Gold	Trench
"My Blood"	2018	81	2	4	—	— (Note: "My Blood" did not enter the Flemish Ultratop chart, but peaked at number 22 on the Ultratip chart.)	76	61	— (Note: "My Blood" did not enter the NZ Top 40 Singles Chart, but peaked at number 12 on the NZ Hot Singles Chart.)	—	62	RIAA: Platinum; BPI: Silver; MC: Platinum; RMNZ: Gold	Trench
"Chlorine" (Note: On February 8, 2019, "Chlorine (Alternative Mix)" was released to streaming services. The length of the mix is three minutes and 11 seconds, compared to the original length of five minutes and 24 seconds.)	2019	— (Note: "Chlorine" did not enter the Billboard Hot 100, but peaked at number five on the Bubbling Under Hot 100 chart.)	1	3	—	—	85	64	— (Note: "Chlorine" did not enter the NZ Top 40 Singles Chart, but peaked at number 12 on the NZ Hot Singles Chart.)	—	— (Note: "Chlorine" did not enter the UK singles chart, but peaked at number 96 on the Singles Sales Chart and number 58 on the Video Streaming Chart.)	RIAA: 2× Platinum; BPI: Gold; MC: 2× Platinum; RMNZ: Platinum	Trench
"The Hype" (Note: On July 26, 2019, "The Hype (Alt Mix)" was released to streaming services. The length of the mix is three minutes and 22 seconds, compared to the original length of four minutes and 25 seconds. A vertical music video was created to accompany the alternative mix.)	2019	—	1	3	—	—	—	—	—	—	—	RIAA: Gold	Trench
"Level of Concern"	2020	23	1	1	83	— (Note: "Level of Concern" did not enter the Flemish Ultratop chart, but peaked at number 13 on the Ultratip chart.)	53	29	— (Note: "Level of Concern" did not enter the NZ Top 40 Singles Chart, but peaked at number two on the NZ Hot Singles Chart.)	— (Note: "Level of Concern" did not enter the Swedish Singellista Chart, but peaked at number two on the Swedish Heatseeker Chart.)	42	RIAA: Platinum; BPI: Silver; MC: Platinum; RMNZ: Gold	Scaled and Icy (Livestream Version)
"Christmas Saves the Year"	2020	—	32	35	—	— (Note: "Christmas Saves the Year" did not enter the Flemish Ultratop chart, but charted as an "extra tip" on the Ultratip chart.)	—	—	—	—	—		Non-album single
"Shy Away"	2021	87	1	7	—	— (Note: "Shy Away" did not enter the Flemish Ultratop chart, but peaked at number four on the Ultratip chart.)	67	56	— (Note: "Shy Away" did not enter the NZ Top 40 Singles Chart, but peaked at number nine on the NZ Hot Singles Chart.)	— (Note: "Shy Away" did not enter the Swedish Singellista Chart, but peaked at number 11 on the Swedish Heatseeker Chart.)	56	RIAA: Gold; MC: Gold	Scaled and Icy
"Choker"	2021	—	—	14	—	—	—	83	— (Note: "Choker" did not enter the NZ Top 40 Singles Chart, but peaked at number nine on the NZ Hot Singles Chart.)	—	88		Scaled and Icy
"Saturday"	2021	— (Note: "Saturday" did not enter the Billboard Hot 100, but peaked at number four on the Bubbling Under Hot 100 chart.)	1	10	—	— (Note: "Saturday" did not enter the Flemish Ultratop chart, but charted as an "extra tip" on the Ultratip chart.)	—	—	— (Note: "Saturday" did not enter the NZ Top 40 Singles Chart, but peaked at number 14 on the NZ Hot Singles Chart.)	—	97	RIAA: Gold	Scaled and Icy
"The Outside"	2021	—	1	28	—	—	—	—	— (Note: "The Outside" did not enter the NZ Top 40 Singles Chart, but peaked at number 18 on the NZ Hot Singles Chart.)	—	—		Scaled and Icy
"Overcompensate"	2024	64	2	7	—	—	73	49	— (Note: "Overcompensate" did not enter the NZ Top 40 Singles Chart, but peaked at number three on the NZ Hot Singles Chart.)	—	34		Clancy
"Next Semester"	2024	—	—	22	—	—	—	—	— (Note: "Next Semester" did not enter the NZ Top 40 Singles Chart, but peaked at number 23 on the NZ Hot Singles Chart.)	—	—		Clancy
"Backslide"	2024	—	—	21	—	—	—	—	— (Note: "Backslide" did not enter the NZ Top 40 Singles Chart, but peaked at number 10 on the NZ Hot Singles Chart.)	—	— (Note: "Backslide" did not chart on the UK Singles Chart, but peaked at number 99 on the Official Singles Midweek Chart 100)		Clancy
"The Craving"	2024	83	2	20	—	—	—	—	—	—	66		Clancy
"The Line"	2024	— (Note: "The Line" did not enter the Billboard Hot 100, but peaked at number nine on the Bubbling Under Hot 100 chart.)	1	13	—	—	86	—	—	—	87		Arcane League of Legends: Season 2
"Doubt" (demo version)	2025	—	—	23	—	—	96	—	— (Note: "Doubt" (demo) did not enter the NZ Top 40 Singles Chart, but peaked at number 9 on the NZ Hot Singles Chart.)	— (Note: "Doubt" did not enter the Swedish Singles Chart, but peaked at number nine on the Swedish Heatseeker chart.)	—		Non-album single
"The Contract"	2025	— (Note: "The Contract" did not enter the Billboard Hot 100, but peaked at number 4 on the Bubbling Under Hot 100 chart.)	1	15	—	—	—	51	— (Note: "The Contract" did not enter the NZ Top 40 Singles Chart, but peaked at number 3 on the NZ Hot Singles Chart.)	—	33		Breach
"Drum Show"	2025	— (Note: "Drum Show" did not enter the Billboard Hot 100, but peaked at number 13 on the Bubbling Under Hot 100 chart.)	—	21	—	—	—	—	— (Note: "Drum Show" did not enter the NZ Top 40 Singles Chart, but peaked at number 3 on the NZ Hot Singles Chart.)	—	90		Breach
"City Walls"	2025	83	1	11	—	—	87	60	— (Note: "City Walls" did not enter the NZ Top 40 Singles Chart, but peaked at number 3 on the NZ Hot Singles Chart.)	—	49		Breach
"Drag Path"	2026	57	1	9	59	—	42	25	31	— (Note: "Drag Path" did not enter the Swedish Singellista Chart, but peaked at number 3 on the Swedish Heatseeker Chart.)	23		Breach (Digital Remains)
"—" denotes a recording that did not chart or was not released in that territory.

=== Promotional singles ===
List of promotional singles, with selected chart positions, showing year released and album name
Title	Year	Peak chart positions						Certifications	Album
Title	Year	US	US Rock	AUS	CAN	NZ Heat.	UK	Certifications	Album
"Ode to Sleep"	2012	—	—	—	—	—	—	RIAA: Platinum	Vessel
"Migraine"	2013	—	—	—	—	—	—	RIAA: Platinum; ARIA: Gold; BPI: Silver; RMNZ: Gold	Vessel
"We Don't Believe What's on TV"	2015	—	36	—	—	—	—	RIAA: Platinum	Blurryface
"Goner"	2015	—	—	—	—	— (Note: "Goner" did not enter the New Zealand Heatseekers chart, but peaked at number 32 on the Hot Songs chart.)	—	RIAA: Platinum	Blurryface
"Cancer" (My Chemical Romance cover)	2016	91	6	53	75	1	93	RIAA: Gold	Rock Sound Presents: The Black Parade
"Morph"	2018	— (Note: "Morph" did not enter the Billboard Hot 100, but peaked at number six on the Bubbling Under Hot 100 chart.)	9	—	—	11	67	RIAA: Gold	Trench
"Bandito"	2019	—	18	—	—	—	—		Trench
"—" denotes a recording that did not chart or was not released in that territory.

== Other charted and certified songs ==
List of songs, with selected chart positions, showing year released and album name
Title	Year	Peak chart positions						Certifications	Album
Title	Year	US Bub.	US Alt.	US Rock	CAN	NZ Hot (Note: Peaks on the NZ Hot Singles Chart: Songs from Trench: Songs from Scaled and Icy: Songs from Clancy: "The Line": Songs from Breach:)	UK	Certifications	Album
"Semi-Automatic"	2013	—	—	—	—	—	—	RIAA: Gold	Vessel
"Screen"	2013	—	—	—	—	—	—	RIAA: Gold	Vessel
"The Run and Go"	2013	—	—	—	—	—	—	RIAA: Gold	Vessel
"Trees"	2013	—	—	—	—	—	—	RIAA: Gold	Vessel
"Truce"	2013	—	—	—	—	—	—	RIAA: Gold	Vessel
"Polarize"	2015	—	—	31	—	—	—	RIAA: Platinum; BPI: Silver; RMNZ: Gold	Blurryface
"The Judge"	2015	—	—	32	—	—	—	RIAA: Platinum; ARIA: Gold; BPI: Silver; MC: Platinum; RMNZ: Gold	Blurryface
"Message Man"	2015	—	—	35	—	—	—	RIAA: Platinum; BPI: Silver; RMNZ: Gold	Blurryface
"Hometown"	2015	—	—	—	—	—	—	RIAA: Platinum; BPI: Silver; RMNZ: Gold	Blurryface
"Not Today"	2015	—	—	—	—	—	—	RIAA: Gold	Blurryface
"Goner"	2015	—	—	—	—	32	—	RIAA: Platinum	Blurryface
"Neon Gravestones"	2018	—	—	13	—	14	—		Trench
"Smithereens"	2018	—	—	14	—	15	—		Trench
"Cut My Lip"	2018	—	—	19	—	—	—		Trench
"Pet Cheetah"	2018	—	—	16	—	—	—		Trench
"Legend"	2018	—	—	21	—	—	—		Trench
"Leave the City"	2018	—	—	23	—	—	—		Trench
"Good Day"	2021	—	—	30	—	19	—		Scaled and Icy
"Never Take It"	2021	—	—	36	—	—	—		Scaled and Icy
"Mulberry Street"	2021	—	—	32	—	20	—		Scaled and Icy
"Formidable"	2021	—	—	38	—	—	—		Scaled and Icy
"Bounce Man"	2021	—	—	39	—	—	—		Scaled and Icy
"No Chances"	2021	—	—	35	—	—	—		Scaled and Icy
"Redecorate"	2021	—	—	37	—	—	—		Scaled and Icy
"Midwest Indigo"	2024	—	—	30	—	12	—		Clancy
"Routines in the Night"	2024	—	19	26	—	7	—		Clancy
"Vignette"	2024	—	—	29	—	11	—		Clancy
"Lavish"	2024	—	—	36	—	—	—		Clancy
"Navigating"	2024	—	—	34	—	15	—		Clancy
"Snap Back"	2024	—	—	42	—	—	—		Clancy
"Oldies Station"	2024	—	—	46	—	—	—		Clancy
"At the Risk of Feeling Dumb"	2024	—	—	38	—	—	—		Clancy
"Paladin Strait"	2024	—	—	47	—	—	—		Clancy
"Rawfear"	2025	10	—	20	—	5	88		Breach
"Garbage"	2025	—	—	23	—	10	—		Breach
"Downstairs"	2025	18	—	22	—	8	—		Breach
"Robot Voices"	2025	—	—	28	—	—	—		Breach
"Center Mass"	2025	—	—	29	—	—	—		Breach
"Cottonwood"	2025	—	—	36	—	—	—		Breach
"One Way"	2025	—	—	30	—	—	—		Breach
"Days Lie Dormant"	2025	—	—	37	—	—	—		Breach
"Tally"	2025	—	—	34	—	—	—		Breach
"Intentions"	2025	—	—	40	—	—	—		Breach
"—" denotes a recording that did not chart or was not released in that territory.

== Other songs released by Twenty One Pilots ==
List of other songs recorded and released by Twenty One Pilots
Title	Year	Release
"Time to Say Goodbye" (Note: "Time to Say Goodbye" was included on a demo CD released before their debut album, but allegedly excluded from the latter due to its sampling of the song "Con te partirò". The song was performed 23 times in total during the band's first tour in their hometown.) (Note: For a short time in 2010, a bundle of unreleased songs were made available for a brief time on Twenty One Pilots' official website. This included an original song, "Time to Say Goodbye", which samples "Con te partirò"; an alternate version of the Twenty One Pilots track "Air Catcher"; a cover of "Jar of Hearts"; and, tracks that would eventually appear on Regional at Best, such as "Car Radio", "Trees", "Slowtown". While available, these songs could be downloaded for free.) (Note: "Time to Say Goodbye" and "Jar of Hearts" were made available on the band's SoundCloud account, however, the account has since been deactivated.)	2009	Non-album single
"Air Catcher (Studio Version)" (Note: When released to the website for download, it was titled "Air Catcher (Studio Version)"; however, some refer to it as an "Alternate" or "Alternative" version.)	2010	Non-album single
"Jar of Hearts" (Note: Twenty One Pilots' cover of "Jar of Hearts" by Christina Perri was released to their YouTube channel.) (Christina Perri cover)	2010	Non-album single
"Save" (Note: "Save" was written and recorded by Tyler Joseph before the band's formation and is often associated with his solo project No Phun Intended. The song was eventually rerecorded and made available for download on the band's website for a brief time in 2011.)	2011	Non-album single
"Can't Help Falling in Love" (Elvis Presley cover)	2012	Holding On to You (EP)
"Goner" (Note: This is an early version of the song "Goner," which would eventually appear on the band's fourth album Blurryface. A music video featuring this version was uploaded to the band's YouTube channel in 2012, less than a year before the release of their third album Vessel.)	2012	Non-album single
"Screen" (Demo) (Note: Shortly after a newsletter was sent to subscribers containing bonus tracks for Regional at Best, another newsletter was sent containing a demo version of a song called "Screen". The demo was recorded in 2011 and released in 2012, before the completed version of the song would appear on the 2013 album Vessel.)	2012	Non-album single
"Mad World" (Note: Twenty One Pilots' studio cover of "Mad World" by Tears for Fears was released exclusively to their YouTube channel.) (Tears for Fears cover)	2014	Non-album single
"Chlorine (Mexico City)"	2019	Location Sessions (Note: In 2019, Twenty One Pilots began releasing alternative versions of their songs from Trench, performed with live looping at different locations. The first song was "Chlorine", titled "Chlorine (19.4326° N, 99.1332° W)" and later retitled "Chlorine (Mexico City)". The second song was "Cut My Lip", titled "Cut My Lip (40.6782°N, 73.9442° W)" and later retitled "Cut My Lip (Brooklyn)". The third song was "The Hype", titled "The Hype (Berlin)". These three alternative versions, along with "Level of Concern (live from outside)", were released as singles before being compiled onto the Location Sessions EP.)
"Cut My Lip (Brooklyn)"	2019	Location Sessions
"The Hype (Berlin)"	2019	Location Sessions
"Level of Concern (live from outside)"	2020	Location Sessions
"The Line"	2024	Arcane League of Legends: Season 2 (Soundtrack from the Animated Series)
"Doubt (demo)"	2025	Non-album single

== Music videos ==
List of music videos, showing year released and directors
Title	Year	Director(s)	Ref.
"Jar of Hearts"	2011	Mark C. Eshleman	
"Forest"	2011	Mark C. Eshleman	
"Goner"	2012	Mark C. Eshleman	
"Can't Help Falling in Love"	2012	Mark C. Eshleman	
"Holding On to You"	2012	Jordan Bahat	
"House of Gold" (Note: Two music videos were recorded for "House of Gold". The first was directed by Mark C. Eshleman for the Regional at Best (bonus track) version of the song. The second was directed by Warren Kommers for the Vessel version of the song.)	2012	Mark C. Eshleman	
"Guns for Hands"	2013	Mark C. Eshleman	
"Car Radio"	2013	Mark C. Eshleman	
"Lovely" (Note: The music video for "Lovely" is exclusive to Japan.)	2013	Mark C. Eshleman	
"House of Gold"	2013	Warren Kommers	
"Migraine" (Note: The music video for "Migraine" is only available in Europe.)	2013	Mark C. Eshleman	
"Truce"	2013	Mark C. Eshleman	
"Mad World"	2014	Mark C. Eshleman	
"Ode to Sleep"	2014	Mark C. Eshleman	
"Fairly Local"	2015	Mark C. Eshleman	
"Tear in My Heart"	2015	Marc Klasfeld	
"Stressed Out"	2015	Mark C. Eshleman	
"Lane Boy"	2015	Mark C. Eshleman	
"Ride"	2015	Mark C. Eshleman	
"Heathens"	2016	Andrew Donoho	
"Cancer"	2016	Tantrum Content	
"Heavydirtysoul"	2017	Andrew Donoho	
"Jumpsuit"	2018	Andrew Donoho	
"Nico and the Niners"	2018	Andrew Donoho	
"Levitate"	2018	Andrew Donoho	
"My Blood"	2018	Tim Mattia	
"Chlorine"	2019	Mark C. Eshleman	
"The Hype"	2019	Andrew Donoho	
"The Hype" (Vertical Video)	2019	Twenty One Pilots	
"The Hype (Berlin)"	2019	Twenty One Pilots	
"Level of Concern"	2020	Reel Bear Media	
"Level of Concern" (Never-Ending Music Video)	2020	Twenty One Pilots	
"Shy Away"	2021	Miles Cable and AJ Favicchio	
"Choker"	2021	Mark C. Eshleman	
"Saturday"	2021	Andrew Donoho	
"Christmas Saves the Year"	2021	Mr. Oz	
"The Outside"	2022	Andrew Donoho	
"Overcompensate"	2024	Mark C. Eshleman	
"Next Semester"	2024	Andrew Donoho	
"Backslide"	2024	Josh Dun	
"The Craving (Single Version)"	2024	Mark C. Eshleman	
"Midwest Indigo"	2024	Mark C. Eshleman	
"Routines in the Night"	2024	Mark C. Eshleman	
"Vignette"	2024	Mark C. Eshleman	
"The Craving (Jenna's Version)"	2024	Mark C. Eshleman	
"Lavish"	2024	Mark C. Eshleman	
"Navigating"	2024	Mark C. Eshleman	
"Snap Back"	2024	Mark C. Eshleman	
"Oldies Station"	2024	Mark C. Eshleman	
"At the Risk of Feeling Dumb"	2024	Mark C. Eshleman	
"Paladin Strait"	2024	Jensen Noen	
"The Line"	2024	Andrew Donoho	
"Doubt (demo)"	2025	Unknown	
"The Contract"	2025	Frédéric de Pontcharra	
"Drum Show"	2025	Mark C. Eshleman	
"City Walls"	2025	Jensen Noen	
"Drag Path"	2026	Tobias Gundorff Boesen	

== See also ==
- List of songs recorded by Twenty One Pilots
- Tyler Joseph discography
