= House of Gold (Twenty One Pilots song) =

Twenty One Pilots song

Single by Twenty One Pilots

from the album Vessel
- Released: August 6, 2013
- Genre: Alternative folk; folk; Americana; indie pop
- Length: 2:43
- Label: Fueled by Ramen
- Songwriter: Tyler Joseph
- Producer: Greg Wells

Twenty One Pilots singles chronology
"Lovely" (2013)	"House of Gold" (2013)	"Fake You Out" (2013)

Music video
- "House of Gold" on YouTube

"House of Gold" is a song written and recorded by American alternative duo Twenty One Pilots from their third studio album, Vessel (2013). It is an alternative folk song driven by ukulele that is built on an aching melody and stomping drums. Tyler Joseph wrote and dedicated the song to his mother, Kelly Joseph.

The song was released as a single from the debut album, impacting radio on August 6, 2013. The accompanying music video for "House of Gold" was directed by Warren Kommers and released on October 2, 2013. The video depicts Joseph and Josh Dun being severed in half while still managing to play their instruments.

"House of Gold" received generally favorable reviews from contemporary music critics. "House of Gold" has since been certified Platinum by the Recording Industry Association of America (RIAA).

== Background ==
After expanding their audience with a series of videos directed by their friend Mark Eshleman, Twenty One Pilots grew and captured the attention of the major record labels. In 2012, once they signed to the Atlantic subsidiary label Fueled by Ramen, the band released their Three Songs EP and began working with record producer Greg Wells on their debut studio album, Vessel. "House of Gold" was released as the fourth song on the track-listing of their major-label debut album. A mixture of songs from their previous EPs in addition to new tracks, Vessel was released in January 2013 and featured "House of Gold" as one of its singles.

Using the Hawaiian instrument, the ukulele, lead singer Tyler Joseph wrote "House of Gold" for his mother and dedicated the song to her. After walking into a used music store, Joseph saw and purchased a ukulele even though he had no idea how to play. He figured the instrument was meant for him because it was small and he thinks he has "small hands". He was able to learn how to play the ukulele, learning a few chords. In an interview with Rock Sound, Joseph briefly explained how 'House of Gold' is about his mother. He said, "...it means a lot to me and for me to reveal exactly what the song is about would be a little too vulnerable, but I love my mom very much and I want to always be there for her, like she was for me, and this song is about that." Alongside being a folky, ukulele-driven tribute, its songwriting demonstrates a traditional form of Americana, featuring lyrics that toy with poignant questions. Moreover, as a lighthearted ode to Joseph's mother, "House of Gold" endures a theme rooted in his family values, as highlighted in the album artwork for Vessel, which featured the grandfathers of Joseph and drummer Josh Dun.

== Composition ==
"House of Gold" is an alternative folk song that lasts for a duration of two minutes and forty-three seconds. According to the sheet music published at Musicnotes.com by Alfred Publishing Co., Inc, the song is written in the time signature of common time, with a moderate tempo of 116 beats per minute. "House of Gold" is composed in the key of C Major while Tyler Joseph's vocal range spans one octave and five notes, from a low of F_{3} to a high of C_{5}. The song has a basic sequence of C–F–Am–G–C–F–C–G/B–C during its chorus and verses and follows F–A/E–Dm–B♭m/D♭–F/C–C–F–C/E at the bridge. The musical composition features a folky, ukulele-driven atmosphere that delves into a traditional form of Americana. As one of their slower numbers, "House of Gold" exhibits an acoustic accompaniment driven by ukulele while Joseph's sings with dreary emo pop-like vocal stylings. The musical arrangement retains a memorable, aching melody built on simplistic ukulele folk as well as stomping drums.

Lyrically, "House of Gold" is a lighthearted ode about Tyler Joseph's mother. It serves as a folksy tribute, featuring a heartfelt statement of mother-son love. "House of Gold" discusses generosity, and centers Joseph being willing to go great lengths in order to care for his mom. Bearing a simple yet effective delivery, it pays homage to the patience and unbridled love of a parent. The song expresses loving lyrics which take on a pessimistic yet positive viewpoint. They play with poignant questions: "She asked me, 'Son, when I grow old, will you buy me a house of gold? / And when your father turns to stone, will you take care of me?"

== Release and promotion ==
"House of Gold" originally appeared as a free download on the band's website in 2011, along with an official music video directed by Reel Bear Media. In addition to several songs from the band's sophomore album Regional at Best (2011), the song was augmented, included and re-released in 2013 on the track-listing of their major-label debut studio album Vessel on the record label Fueled by Ramen. "House of Gold" was released as a single from the duo's major-label debut album, impacting radio on August 6, 2013.

== Critical reception ==
"House of Gold" received generally favorable reviews from contemporary music critics. Rock Sound Magazine deemed "House of Gold" as the band's "latest banger." Graham Clark from The Yorkshire Times remarked, "Things really get into gear with House of Gold, if you like the group Train, then this track will make sense. It has a nagging melody that sticks in your head all day. They will be playing this track in years to come at the bigger venues they are surely destined to play." Comparing Joseph's vocal stylings to that of the band Bright Eyes, AllMusic's Fred Thomas described "House of Gold" as "uncharacteristically folky." Sejal Popat of The Cut stated, "'House of Gold' offers a sweet acoustic respite from the emotionally raw tracks preceding it." Jason Pettigrew for Alternative Press claimed, "This song is crucial to the band's creative resilience because it's more Grand Ole Opry than wild dance party. The boys’ dip into an Americana vibe that made industry wags think they had the next Mumford & Sons on their hands." Kerrang! praised Tyler Joseph's songwriting, declaring, "One of the loveliest lyrics, on one of the loveliest songs, this one takes a pessimistic view and flips it into a positive, whilst also somehow remaining pessimistic. We have no idea how he managed that." Likewise, Sam Law, from the same publication, summarized "House of Gold" saying, "A folky, ukulele-led tribute to Tyler's mother, it showcases their mastery of a far more traditional form of Americana as lyrics toy with the most poignant of questions: 'She asked me, 'Son, when I grow old, will you buy me a house of gold? / And when your father turns to stone, will you take care of me?' A heartfelt statement of mother-son love." Sharing similar sentiments, Harper Beattie of Atwood Magazine wrote, "ukulele folk track 'House of Gold' is a lighthearted ode to Joseph's mother – persisting a theme of Joseph's entrenched family values... It was these elements, including the defiance of seemingly all rules of radio and mainstream aesthetics, that made Vessel a fan-favorite persisting among the Top 40 charts to this day."

== Commercial performance ==
The single became fairly successful on rock and alternative-radio, becoming one of the band's early hits from their 2013 album Vessel. "House of Gold" became the second single by Twenty One Pilots to reach Alternative Songs top 10, following "Holding on to You". On July 7, 2017, "House of Gold" was certified Platinum by the Recording Industry Association of America (RIAA) for sales of one million paid digital downloads.

== Music video ==
The single's accompanying music video was directed by Warren Kommers, and features extensive cinematography, a peculiar storyline and the usage of green screen effects. It depicts the duo being severed in half while still managing to play their instruments. On October 4, 2013, the music video for "House of Gold" was released.

A seemingly normal visual opener sets the background of a stunning sunrise over a field of farm equipment. Tyler Joseph sings and strums his ukulele along to the song until it's eventually revealed that he is merely a severed torso. He is seen floating legless above the field and singing to a yellow house. Josh Dun, who also happens to just be a severed torso, crawls toward Joseph and up under a blue pickup truck. He does so in order to use its undercarriage to maintain the track's beat. The duo's legs are displayed to be off in other areas, respectively walking and playing drums on a tractor wheel bass drum. After the last verse and prechorus finishes, Dun disappears, and Tyler plays the final, softer chorus, and his severed top half falls to the ground, which is seen from the window of the yellow house.

=== Reception ===
Rachel Campell for Alternative Press ranked the video for "House of Gold" as the best music video by Twenty One Pilots. She stated, "The cinematography of this one is the most impressive of their music videos, but the bizarre yet intriguing storyline and usage of a green screen mutilation really make it stick out from the bunch." Jason Pettigrew, from the same publication, described the music video for "House of Gold" saying, "The video is 200 kinds of amazing, though, like they had to undercut its whimsy with something shocking."

== Live performances ==
Twenty One Pilots performed "House of Gold" at TSB Area in Wellington, New Zealand before 3,000 fans during the first concert on the Oceania leg of their Emotional Roadshow World Tour. The duo performed "House of Gold" during an appearance at the Fuse News Waffle House at Bonnaroo Music Festival on June 14, 2013. Lead singer Tyler Joseph began the live performance with a dedication to his mom.

== Covers ==
A once-off supergroup composed of musicians Chris Martin, Beck, Red Hot Chili Peppers drummer Chad Smith, Jakob Dylan of the Wallflowers and E Street Band keyboardist Roy Bittan formed in October 2016 to cover songs from Bruce Springsteen, Pink Floyd and the Beach Boys during a benefit concert in Malibu, California for the Boys & Girls Clubs of America, had covered the song during one of their concerts. Martin also performed songs with two children, Apple and Moses. His son Moses appeared onstage to sing "House of Gold" while he played an acoustic guitar. On August 17, 2017, Coldplay performed a short snippet of the song during a concert at Soldier Field.

== Track listing ==
Digital download / stream
No.	Title	Length
1.	"House of Gold"	2:43

== Personnel ==
- Tyler Joseph – vocals, ukulele, piano, keyboard, synthesizers, programming
- Josh Dun – drums, percussion, tambourine

== Charts ==
=== Weekly charts ===
Chart (2014)	Peak position
US Hot Rock & Alternative Songs (Billboard)	38
US Alternative Airplay (Billboard)	10
US Rock & Alternative Airplay (Billboard)	18

=== Year-end charts ===
Chart (2014)	Position
US Alternative Songs (Billboard)	42

== Certifications ==
Region	Certification	Certified units/sales
Australia (ARIA)	Gold	35,000^{‡}
Canada (Music Canada)	Platinum	80,000^{‡}
New Zealand (RMNZ)	Gold	15,000^{‡}
United Kingdom (BPI)	Silver	200,000^{‡}
United States (RIAA)	2× Platinum	2,000,000^{‡}
^{‡} Sales+streaming figures based on certification alone.

== Release history ==
Region	Date	Format	Label
Worldwide	October 2, 2013	Digital download; stream	Fueled by Ramen
