= Holding On to You (Twenty One Pilots song) =

Twenty One Pilots song

Song by Twenty One Pilots

from the album Regional at Best
- Released: July 8, 2011
- Length: 4:26
- Producer: Twenty One Pilots

"Holding On to You"

Single by Twenty One Pilots

from the album Vessel
- Released: September 11, 2012
- Recorded: 2011–2012
- Genre: Rap rock; hip pop; synth-pop; electropop; alternative rock; post-emo
- Length: 4:23
- Label: Fueled by Ramen; Roadrunner
- Songwriters: Tyler Joseph; Maurice Gleaton; Charles Hammond; Robert Hill; Deangelo Hunt; Bernard Leverette; Gerald Tiller; Jamall Willingham
- Producer: Greg Wells

Twenty One Pilots singles chronology
"Holding On to You" (2012)	"Ode to Sleep" (2012)

Music video
- "Holding on to You" on YouTube

"Holding On to You" is a song by American musical duo Twenty One Pilots from their second studio album Regional at Best (2011). It was re-recorded for their third studio album and major-label debut, Vessel (2013) and released as their debut single. "Holding On to You" features upbeat rhythms and bouncy suspended chords over which Tyler Joseph delivers scattershot raps with down-to-earth sentiments and sings grandiose, euphoric choruses. The track's indie-inspired synth-pop transforms from a sensitive ballad to a hip-hop number with rapped verses and codas. The song contains lyrical elements of "Lean wit It, Rock wit It" by Dem Franchize Boyz. Lyrically, "Holding on to You" is an ode to self-control. It addresses "the claiming of one's own life and holding onto your values." The song's lyrics express introspective lines as well as a sentiment about taking back control of one's own mind, lost to mental health.

The song was released as the lead single from Vessel on September 11, 2012. It impacted rock and alternative radio in 2012 and later mainstream radio in the following year. Upon its release, "Holding On to You" received universal acclaim from contemporary music critics. An accompanying music video for the single was directed by Jordan Bahat and released on November 15, 2012. The video exhibits a mixing of an abstract blend of a live-shoot and radical stage performances. It features smoke, ballerinas and other contemporary dancers who wear skeleton facepaint and makeup while swaying and weaving their bodies around Tyler Joseph and Josh Dun as they perform the song. The music video for "Holding On to You" was praised for its choreography, and Twenty One Pilots was subsequently nominated for the Artist to Watch award at the 2013 MTV Video Music Awards.

== Background ==
The origin of "Holding On to You" was revealed by lead vocalist Tyler Joseph during a special SiriusXM event on January 17, 2019. With only a piano, Joseph played an intimate, career-spanning set list of stripped-down songs before one-hundred fans of Twenty One Pilots. The performances were part of SiriusXM's Town Hall special with the duo on Alt Nation, accompanied by story-telling and followed by a Q&A session featuring both Joseph and bandmate Josh Dun, which was hosted by SiriusXM's Jeff Regan. Before performing the song, Joseph shared how he had been looking in his journal to prepare for the special and remembered where his mindspace was. A journal entry from 2010 detailed how he was uncertain of the band's direction at the time and contemplating abandoning his musical dream. However, Joseph started on a new song that had the working title "Entertain My Faith" and got very excited about it, so he decided to keep working. Originally named "Entertain My Faith", the song subsequently became "Holding On to You". Joseph said it was really cool to watch where he was when he wrote the song and see what it has become for both him as well as other people.

"Holding On to You" originally appeared on Regional at Best before becoming the first single from the band's major-label debut album Vessel. After expanding their audience with a series of music videos directed by their friend Mark Eshleman, Twenty One Pilots grew and captured the attention of the major record labels. In 2012, once they signed to the Atlantic subsidiary label Fueled by Ramen, the band released their Three Songs EP and began working with record producer Greg Wells on their debut studio album, Vessel. A mixture of songs from their previous EPs in addition to new tracks, the album was released in January 2013 and featured "Holding On to You" as one of its singles. "Holding On to You" was one of five songs retrieved from the band's sophomore release, Regional at Best (2011). The track's record production received polishing by Wells for inclusion on Vessel.

== Recording ==
"Holding On to You" was produced by Greg Wells and recorded at Rocket Carousel Studio in Los Angeles, California. It is one of five songs reclaimed from the band's sophomore release, Regional at Best (2011). The track's record production received polishing by Wells for inclusion on Vessel (2013). Twenty One Pilots saw a progression from rough demo versions on self-released recordings of Regional at Best to glossy, radio-friendly production on Vessel, handled by Wells. In an interview with HuffPost, the duo described what their progression from creating an EP into doing a full-length album was like. According to Tyler Joseph, "Regional At Best really is just a glorified mix-tape that we used as a background to solidifying fans, and it's been kind of our follow through. When you start a band, you need to have some sort of music for people to go home with. I sat down in my studio, and man, I cranked out songs." Regarding the track's engineering, when they entered the recording studio, there remained much of the same programming and vocals. The vocals for "Holding on to You" were the same ones that Joseph recorded in his basement before Twenty One Pilots ever got signed. They were able to take and insert those files where they needed to be in the mix.

The recording is a realizing of the band's pop sensibilities, bending parts of mainstream pop towards more introspective ends. During an interview with Rock Sound, Tyler Joseph provided insight into each song on the band's forthcoming album Vessel. He elaborated, "I've always just seen it as one big body of work but to have 'Holding On to You' kind of be the focus track makes sense to me. It does stand in the middle of what to expect from us – having to do with a lot of different genres, the melody in this song is digestible and it's one of my favourite chord progressions I've ever done. I like that the chorus only happens twice in the song which is a big no no! You are supposed to do it four or five times especially if you want to see a lot of success and have your songs on Super Bowl commercials."

== Composition ==
"Holding On to You" is a hip-pop song that runs for a duration of four minutes and twenty-three seconds. The musical composition features indie-inspired synth-pop and transforms from a sensitive ballad to a hip-hop number with rapped verses. It is an energetic track that spans a range of genres while the band manages to compact several sounds into it. According to the sheet music published at Musicnotes.com by EMI Music Publishing, it is written in the time signature of common time, with a moderate tempo of 90 beats per minute. "Holding On to You" is composed in the key of B Major, while Tyler Joseph's vocal range spans one octave and four notes from a low F♯_{3} to a high of B_{4}. The song has a basic sequence of B_{sus2}/G♯–B_{sus2}/F♯–B/E–B_{sus2} in the verses and outro, changes to E–G♯m–B–F♯–C♯m at the chorus, maintains G♯m–F♯/A♯–B–E during the interlude and follows G♯m–F♯–E–B at the bridge as its chord progression. The track contains lyrical elements of "Lean wit It, Rock wit It" by Dem Franchize Boyz.

"Holding on to You"
Lyrically, "Holding On to You" is an ode to self-control. It addresses holding onto your values, claiming one's own life and taking back control of a mind lost to mental health. The track's indie-inspired synth-pop transforms from a sensitive ballad to a hip-hop number with rapped verses and codas. Tyler Joseph delivers scattershot raps harboring down-to-earth sentiments and sings grandiose, euphoric choruses over upbeat rhythms.

Opening with forceful rap verses, the infectious musical arrangement swiftly segues into piano-led chorus lines that build emotion. "Holding On to You" retains a sleek groove built on the immense beats and brunt electro-pop coursing through hooks, in addition to bouncy suspended chords. The song's instrumentation mixes squelchy synths, zippy keyboards and melodic guitars. The track features upbeat rhythms over which Joseph recites scattershot raps and ecstatic choruses with a catchy delivery and overwrought vocals. His vocal stylings compound rap with rock-oriented singing during the grandiose, spirit-lifting refrains. Josh Dun's drumming provides a rhythm, playing in a relentless punk-inspired fashion.

Lyrically, "Holding On to You" is an ode to self-control. The song addresses "claiming one's own life and holding onto your values." It delivers a plethora of contemplative lines as well as a sentiment about taking back control of one's own mind, lost to mental health. "Holding On to You" presents a different take from Joseph on battling depression, one with a more overtly spiritual subtext. His lyrics emphatically encourage listeners to fight self-doubt, with Joseph instructing, "Take the pain / Ignite it / Tie a noose around your mind / Loose enough to breathe fine and tie it". His down-to-earth lyrical sentiments punctuate the song's musical elements, arriving in energetic rap codas. Joseph passionately criticizes meaningless music on "Holding On to You", rapping the lines, "Lean with it. Rock with it. When we gonna stop with it? / Lyrics that mean nothing / We were gifted with thought / Is it time to move our feet to an introspective beat". They illustrate his use of clever wordplay on music beats and heartbeats in order to encourage listeners to look inward and impart a lesson of listening to one's own heart: "It ain't the speakers that bump hearts, it's our hearts that make the beat."

== Release and promotion ==
"Holding On to You" was released by Twenty One Pilots as their debut single. It was released as the lead single of their third studio album Vessel. The track originally appeared on "Regional at Best" before becoming the first single from "Vessel". "Holding On to You" was released as the first single from Vessel in the iTunes Store worldwide on September 11, 2012 but was first released on Twenty One Pilots's PureVolume account on September 7, 2012. The song impacted alternative radio on December 4, 2012, and released to mainstream radio on June 11, 2013.

In an interview with Rock Sound, Tyler Joseph gave his thoughts on the single release. He imparted, "We live in a world where there are singles and to think that way is very foreign to me... I've never thought 'Here's my single and here's all the other songs.' I've always just seen Vessel as one big body of work but to have 'Holding On to You' kind of be the focus track makes sense to me."

"Holding On to You" was released as the sixth song on the track-listing the second disc of their live album Blurryface Live. The album was released exclusively on vinyl record format as opposed to digital or compact disc on November 25, 2016. On Thanksgiving weekend, Twenty One Pilots decided to finish off the year with a vinyl-only live album recorded a month prior during their Emotional Roadshow World Tour. Blurryface Live is derived from their October 18, 2016 concert at Fox Oakland Theatre in Oakland, California.

== Critical reception ==
Upon its release, the duo garnered praise from contemporary music critics for "Holding On to You". Rachel Brodsky of MTV News called "Holding On to You" a "ridiculously energetic, genre-spanning track". She exclaimed, "we were immediately struck by the way these guys cram so many sounds into JUST. ONE. SONG. In a really good way!" Graham Clark from The Yorkshire Times likened the song to being a mixture of the increasingly successful American duo Capital Cities and Of Monsters and Men. Writing for idobi, after panning the awkward flow of "Ode to Sleep" and claiming it left one doubting his rapping ability, Catherhine Yi conceded that Joseph's quickly redeems himself on "Holding On to You". She remarked, "...you can truly feel his passion as he criticizes meaningless music... The song also continues the trend of catchy, grandiose choruses that will lift your spirits every time you hear them." Piet Levy from Milwaukee Journal Sentinel described it as "erratic but always catchy music. 'Holding On to You' was transformed from a sensitive, Death Cab for Cutie-style ballad to a hip-hop banger." Jay Cridlin for Tampa Bay Times characterized the song as "drama-club backpack-rapper". Georgina Langford-Biss of MTV UK claimed, "Twenty One Pilots slyly snuck into the mainstream with the weirdly awesome 'Holding On to You.'" Complimenting its "silky groove", AllMusic's Fred Thomas cites "Holding On to You" as one of three "relentlessly catchy single-ready standouts" featured on the duo's major label debut album, Vessel (2013). He said, "These three songs encapsulate the band's unique calling card, offering up the best examples of what makes their approach different from any number of bands working in similar territory, with enormous beats and full-force electro-pop running through hooks modeled for Top 40 radio, each element punctuated by Joseph's down-to-earth sentiments coming through in the form of caffeinated rap codas."

Anne Nickoloff and Troy Smith for The Plain Dealer ranked it as the duo's first best song, saying, "'Holding On to You' has a special place in Twenty One Pilots fans' hearts and it's easy to see why. ...For many, it was their first impression of the Columbus act. And what an impression it was. 'Holding On to You' is an emotional force of nature that Tyler Joseph clung to during one of the toughest times in his career." Kerrang!'s Sam Law also considered "Holding On to You" to be the fifth best song by Twenty One Pilots. He stated, "Another Regional At Best relic buffed up to high shine on Vessel, "Holding On to You" sees every ounce of the boys' early influence and unfettered creativity poured into four-and-a-half minutes of feeling. Bending the machinery of mainstream pop (upbeat rhythms, scattergun rap, euphoric choruses) to their own, far more introspective ends, this was a warning shot from modern rock revolutionaries ready to crumble traditional genre boundaries and capture the mood of a new generation." Kerrang! also praised its lyrical content, writing, "There's plenty of thoughtful lines in this song about taking back control of your own mind, lost to mental health, but this one stands out in both sentiment and catchy delivery." Dan Leroy of Alternative Press that opined the song was wisely reclaimed from Regional at Best (2011). He continued saying, "Another successful hip-pop hybrid, 'Holding On to You' offers a different Joseph take on battling depression – this time with a more overtly spiritual subtext – and became the duo's first national hit." Jason Pettigrew, from the same publication, ranked "Holding On to You" as their best song. He stated, "This is the answer to the eternal question: What do twenty one pilots sound like? Everything about the band's character, musical methodology, pop sensibility and raison d'etre are fully realized on this song. The perfect gateway drug with all the elements of where they've been and where they will escape from for parts unknown."

== Commercial performance ==
Twenty One Pilots experienced their very first hit single with "Holding On to You". The single was modestly successful on rock and alternative radio, becoming the duo's very first national hit in 2013. Vessel produced the duo's very first Alternative Songs top 10 with the single release of "Holding On to You". In the United States, following the album's release, the lead single debuted at number thirty-eight on Billboard's Alternative Songs chart. "Holding On to You" subsequently reached number ten on the Alternative Songs chart.

== Music video ==
The accompanying music video for "Holding On to You" was directed by Jordan Bahat and released on November 15, 2012. It served as the first official music video release by Twenty One Pilots, following their 2012 debut video clip for the song "Goner", which featured lead singer Tyler Joseph standing in snowy streets with his accordion. For his promotional video, Bahat mixes an abstract blending of a live shoot with radical stage performances. Bahat elaborated, "The intent for the video was to translate the band's live energy onto the screen. As a two-piece band, Twenty One Pilots invests a lot into the theatrics of their live shows to give their fans a big experience." He continued saying, "The song speaks about the demons we wrestle with in our daily lives. Taking some license from the band's knack for theater, I made the demons literal, added some smoke and ballerinas and let the band to the rest."

The video features contemporary dancers wearing intricate skeleton facepaint and makeup bob and weave their bodies around Tyler Joseph and Josh Dun as they perform the song. The contemporary dancers in skeleton makeup flip through the air while performing routines incorporating Joseph and Dun. At its climax, the dancers pull a rope tied around Joseph's neck as he declares, "This ain't a noose, this is a leash / And I have news for you: You must obey me". Once the rope breaks, the dancers are sent into an abyss as a skull-faced ballerina dressed in all-black tights, pointed shoes and a tutu gracefully does a performance.

=== Reception ===
The music video for "Holding On to You" received praise for its choreography. Rachel Campbell from Alternative Press stated, "This all black-and-white number is special as it holds the title of the first official Twenty One Pilots music video, and thankfully it did not disappoint." Alternative Press ranked the video for "Holding On to You" at number two on their list of eleven alternative music videos with the best choreography, writing, "they set the standards pretty high for any future videos they would release." Twenty One Pilots received a nomination for the Artist to Watch award with "Holding On to You" at the 30th annual MTV Video Music Awards, losing to pop singer Austin Mahone.

== Live performance ==
Twenty One Pilots performed "Holding On to You" during their first appearance at the mtvU Woodie Awards in Austin, Texas on March 14, 2013. The duo began their performance with Tyler Joseph self-deprecatingly telling the audience, "I know you don't know who we are", before he and drummer Josh Dun started jumping all over the stage, with the latter executing a backflip off a raised dais. Twenty One Pilots performed "Holding On to You" for an audience of 15,000 during a concert at Amalie Arena in Tampa, Florida on February 28, 2017. Tyler Joseph wore a black balaclava mask while draped in a black sheet at his piano. The band performed "Holding on to You" during their concert headlining the home of the Habs for the very first time at the Bell Centre as part of their Bandito Tour on May 22, 2019. Dun and Joseph began their performance by standing atop the latter's piano, wearing a "bonjour Montreal" shirt a ubiquitous red toque respectively, before the former did a backflip to the floor back to his drum kit.

== Holding On to You (EP) ==
Holding On to You is an extended play released in 2013. The EP has four tracks. Two of them are featured on the album Vessel, which are "Holding On to You", and "The Run and Go". One track is a live performance of "Holding On to You", and the remaining track is a cover of the Elvis Presley song "Can't Help Falling in Love", exclusive to the EP. Tyler Joseph and Josh Dun are the only performers.

Extended play
No.	Title	Length
1.	"Holding On to You"	4:23
2.	"Holding On to You" (live at the LC Pavilion)	5:36
3.	"Can't Help Falling in Love" (Elvis Presley cover)	2:38
4.	"The Run and Go"	3:49

== Charts ==
=== Weekly charts ===
Chart (2013)	Peak position
Belgium (Ultratip Bubbling Under Flanders)	77
US Hot Rock & Alternative Songs (Billboard)	33
US Alternative Airplay (Billboard)	10
US Rock & Alternative Airplay (Billboard)	32

=== Year-end charts ===
Chart (2013)	Position
US Hot Rock Songs (Billboard)	96
US Alternative Songs (Billboard)	33

== Certifications ==
Region	Certification	Certified units/sales
Australia (ARIA)	Gold	35,000^{‡}
New Zealand (RMNZ)	Gold	15,000^{‡}
United Kingdom (BPI)	Silver	200,000^{‡}
United States (RIAA)	2× Platinum	2,000,000^{‡}
^{‡} Sales+streaming figures based on certification alone.

== Release history ==
Region	Date	Format	Label
Worldwide	September 11, 2012	Digital download; stream	Fueled by Ramen
United States	June 11, 2013	Top 40 radio	Fueled by Ramen; Roadrunner
