= Johnny Boy (song) =

Song by American band Twenty One Pilots

Song by Twenty One Pilots

from the album Twenty One Pilots
- Released: December 29, 2009
- Recorded: 2009
- Studio: Tyler Joseph's home studio, Columbus, Ohio
- Genre: Emo; chamber pop
- Length: 4:39
- Label: Self-released
- Songwriter(s): Tyler Joseph
- Producer(s): Tyler Joseph

"Johnny Boy" is a song by American alternative band Twenty One Pilots. The song was first released on the band's demo tapes, and later officially released on their self-titled debut studio album, Twenty One Pilots (2009).

== Meaning ==
In a 2020 interview, the father of the band's frontman Tyler Joseph, Chris, revealed the meaning of the song. Around the time the song was recorded, the United States was going through an economic recession, causing Chris to become unemployed. "I was an admissions director and they said 'Hey, we gotta get rid of this position.' And I was without a job for a while. A lot of people were out of work at that time."

== Reception ==
Writers from Cleveland.com wrote about the song, saying "(It) remains a fan-favorite for Twenty One Pilots diehards. It's by no means the band's best song, but it feels like Tyler Joseph going for a Jack's Mannequin moment. The song is also the centerpiece of the band's debut."

== Personnel ==
- Tyler Joseph – vocals, organs, piano, keyboards, programming, synthesizers, production
- Nick Thomas – guitars, bass, programming
- Chris Salih – drums, percussion
