= Vessel (Twenty One Pilots album) =

2013 studio album by Twenty One Pilots

Studio album by Twenty One Pilots
- Released: January 8, 2013
- Recorded: 2011–2012
- Studios: Rocket Carousel Studio, Los Angeles, California
- Genres: Alternative hip-hop; electropop; indie pop; rap rock; alternative rock; emo
- Length: 47:44
- Label: Fueled by Ramen
- Producer: Greg Wells

Twenty One Pilots chronology
Regional at Best (2011)	Vessel (2013)	Blurryface (2015)

Singles from Vessel
- 1. "Holding On to You" Released: September 11, 2012; 2. "Guns for Hands" Released: November 27, 2012; 3. "House of Gold" Released: August 6, 2013; 4. "Fake You Out" Released: September 15, 2013; 5. "Car Radio" Released: March 18, 2014

Vessel (Note: Referred to as Vessels in some sources) is the third studio album by the American musical duo Twenty One Pilots, which was released on January 8, 2013. It is the band's first album released via Fueled by Ramen, and is their major-label debut album. Vessel debuted at number 58 on the Billboard 200 chart, but reached its peak at number 21 in 2016 following the duo's mainstream breakthrough. As of July 2019, the album has sold over two million equivalent album units in the U.S. All of its tracks have been certified at least Gold by the RIAA, which made Twenty One Pilots the first group or artist to achieve this feat with two separate albums. The album received positive reviews from critics.

== Background ==
Twenty One Pilots signed to Fueled by Ramen in 2012. In the summer of 2012, the duo released the Three Songs EP, which featured the tracks "Guns for Hands", "Migraine", and "Ode to Sleep". On December 18, 2012, the album was made available for streaming via Entertainment Weekly. Vessel was released through Fueled by Ramen on January 8, 2013.

== Production ==
The songs "Ode to Sleep", "Holding On to You", "Car Radio", "Guns for Hands" and "Trees" were taken from their previous independent album, Regional at Best (2011), and re-recorded for Vessel; as a result, the former project was pulled from distribution by the band's newly signed label, Fueled by Ramen. Joseph had composed Regional at Best "not knowing whether or not people were going to hear it" and viewed Vessel as an opportunity to complete these songs. Joseph revealed that he first attempted to record the song "Trees" when he was 17.

Recording for Vessel took place at Rocket Carousel Studio, located in Los Angeles, California with Greg Wells producing. Wells provided additional synths, keyboards and programming Wells mixed the album, while Ian McGregor helped with recording. Mastering was performed by Howie Weinberg and Dan Gerbarg at Howie Weinberg Mastering, also in Los Angeles. While most of the album is massively arranged, the final song "Truce" is a stripped-down piano ballad (without any synths, bass, or even drums); in fact, the song's music (and some of its vocals) was reversed and re-used for the final song of the band's 2025 record Breach (this song being "Intentions").

The album cover features the duo's paternal grandfathers. The man on the left is Dun's grandfather Earl Owen Dun, who died on March 1, 2013, just two months after the release of the album, and the man on the right is Joseph's grandfather Robert O. "Bobby" Joseph, who died on March 17, 2018, a couple of months before the band's eventual release of their album Trench in October that year.

In a fan interview, Joseph spoke on the meaning behind the album's name, saying that "a vessel (our body) is an object carrying something far more important than the outer shell, and when we die, that is set free and lives on."

== Release ==
On September 11, "Holding On to You" was released as a single. "Lovely" was released as a single in Japan on April 17, 2013, and included as a bonus track on the Japanese edition of Vessel. "House of Gold" was released as a radio single on August 6. On September 15, "Fake You Out" was released as a single. On October 4, the music video for "House of Gold" was released. The video was directed by Warren Kommers. "Car Radio" was released as a radio single on March 18, 2014.

On January 8, 2023, the album was re-released as a limited edition vinyl boxset. The vinyl was packaged in a metallic silhouetted cover box, included a poster and polaroid collection, and featured bonus tracks. The release was accompanied by a YouTube variety stream celebrating the record's 10th anniversary; the livestream was a partnership and fundraiser for the non-profit Make-A-Wish Foundation where the band raised over $47,000. The vinyl release was met with sales of an all-time high and an unprecedented demand; delivery of all pre-orders had expected to be as early as February 3, 2023.

== Composition ==
Musically, Vessel has been described as alternative hip-hop, electropop, indie pop, rap rock, indie rock, pop, electronica, alternative rock, and emo.

== Critical reception ==
Professional ratings
Review scores
Source	Rating
AllMusic	3.5/5 stars
Alternative Press	4.5/5 stars
Alter the Press	4.5/5 stars
AMH Network	4/5 stars
Idobi Radio	4/5
Immortal Reviews	95/100
RapReviews	7.5/10
Sputnikmusic	4/5
The Yorkshire Times	4/5

Vessel received positive reviews upon release. Jason Pettigrew, writing for Alternative Press, praised the album's multi-genre influence: "The major-label debut by Twenty One Pilots traipses across electropop, hip hop and classic pop music—and that's just the first song." In a more negative review, Rolling Stone's Dave DiMartino wrote: "The duo has somehow managed to take the most disagreeable and obnoxious aspects of the past decade's "rap-rock" legacy, throw in some of the most aggravating melodic aspects of Linkin Park and Blink-182, and put together a new album that will surely make you want to decry ever liking rock 'n' roll at least three times before a cock crows."

In May 2015, it was announced the album had sold 265,000 copies in the United States. By July 2016, the album had sold over 569,000 copies in the U.S. As of July 2019, the album has been certified 2x multi-platinum in the U.S. by the RIAA. Each of its songs have also been certified gold or higher, making Twenty One Pilots the first and only band or artist to reach this accomplishment on two non-compilation albums after Blurryface (2015) passed the milestone the previous year.

== Tour ==
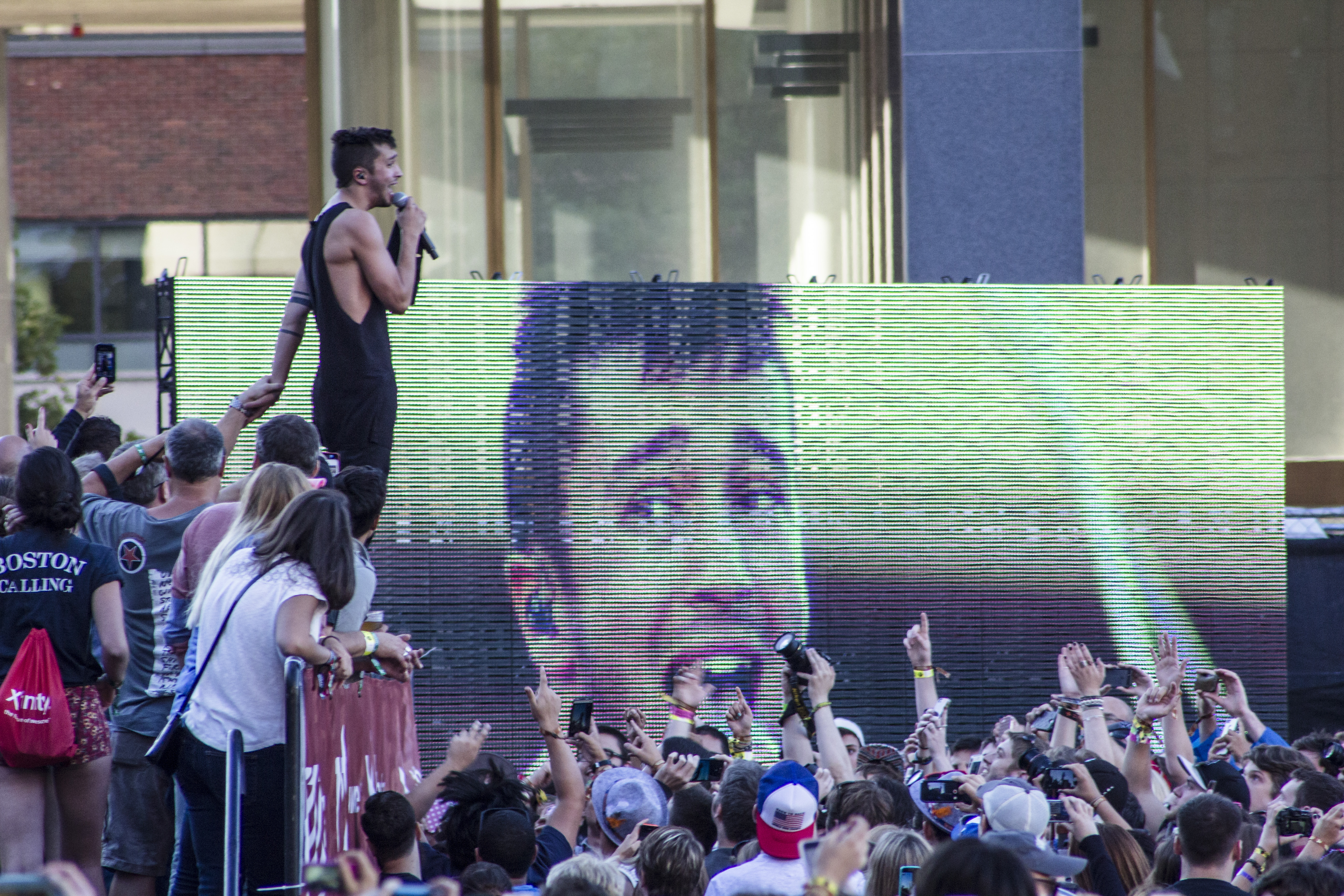
Frontman Tyler Joseph performing during the Quiet Is Violent World Tour in 2014

To help support the album, the band toured internationally throughout the year. In 2014, Twenty One Pilots played a number of music festivals and other events all around the country which focused mainly on the album, such as Lollapalooza, Bonnaroo, Boston Calling, and Firefly. As a result, they took the show requests from different cities and blended them into the Quiet Is Violent World Tour, which began in September 2014, and ended later that same year.

== Track listing ==
All tracks are written by Tyler Joseph, except for "Holding On to You", additionally written by Maurice Gleaton, Charles Hammond, Robert Hill, Deangelo Hunt, Bernard Leverette, Gerald Tiller and Jamall Willingham.

Standard edition
No.	Title	Length
1.	"Ode to Sleep" (re-recorded version; original version on Regional at Best)	5:08
2.	"Holding On to You" (re-recorded version; original version on Regional at Best)	4:23
3.	"Migraine"	3:59
4.	"House of Gold" (re-recorded version)	2:43
5.	"Car Radio" (re-recorded version; original version on Regional at Best)	4:27
6.	"Semi-Automatic"	4:14
7.	"Screen"	3:49
8.	"The Run and Go"	3:49
9.	"Fake You Out"	3:51
10.	"Guns for Hands" (re-recorded version; original version on Regional at Best)	4:32
11.	"Trees" (re-recorded version; original version on Regional at Best)	4:27
12.	"Truce"	2:22
Total length:		47:44

UK/EU bonus tracks
No.	Title	Length
13.	"Glowing Eyes" (from Regional at Best)	4:26
14.	"Kitchen Sink" (from Regional at Best)	5:34
15.	"Lovely" (re-recorded version; original version on Regional at Best)	4:18
16.	"Forest" (from Regional at Best)	4:06
Total length:		65:28

UK iTunes bonus tracks
No.	Title	Length
17.	"The Pantaloon" (live from the LC Pavilion)	3:41
18.	"House of Gold" (live from the LC Pavilion)	3:00
19.	"Track by Track Commentary"	24:09
Total length:		96:18

Korean and Japanese editions bonus tracks
No.	Title	Length
13.	"Holding On to You" (live at LC Pavilion)	5:35
14.	"Car Radio" (live at LC Pavilion)	4:30
15.	"Trees" (live at LC Pavilion)	6:10
16.	"Guns for Hands" (live at LC Pavilion)	6:00
17.	"Ode to Sleep" (live at Newport Music Hall)	5:14
18.	"Forest" (live at Newport Music Hall)	4:32
Total length:		79:05

Japanese special edition bonus tracks
No.	Title	Length
13.	"Lovely" (re-recorded version; original version on Regional at Best)	4:18
14.	"Holding On to You" (live at Newport Music Hall)	5:19
15.	"Car Radio" (live at Newport Music Hall)	4:46
16.	"Guns for Hands" (Dzeko and Torres remix)	5:03
Total length:		66:30

=== 10th anniversary vinyl edition ===
Side A

1. "Ode to Sleep"
2. "Holding On to You"
3. "Migraine"
4. "House of Gold"
5. "Car Radio"
6. "Semi-Automatic"

Side B

1. "Screen"
2. "The Run and Go"
3. "Fake You Out"
4. "Guns for Hands"
5. "Trees"
6. "Truce"

Side C

1. "Holding On to You" (live at LC Pavilion)
2. "Trees" (live at LC Pavilion)
3. "Guns for Hands" (live at LC Pavilion)
4. "Migraine" (live at LC Pavilion)

Side D

1. "Forest" (from Regional at Best)
2. "Glowing Eyes" (from Regional at Best)
3. "Kitchen Sink" (from Regional at Best)
4. "Lovely" (re-recorded version; originally on Regional at Best)

== Personnel ==
Personnel per booklet.

=== Twenty One Pilots ===
- Tyler Joseph – lead and backing vocals, piano (all tracks), ukulele (4, 7), guitar (1–3, 5, 10), bass guitar (1–3, 5–11), keyboards and synthesizers (1–11), keytar (9), programming (1–11), production
- Josh Dun – drums, electronic drums, and auxiliary percussion (1–11); backing vocals (7, 10)

=== Additional personnel ===
- Greg Wells – additional synthesizers, programming (1–11)

=== Production ===
- Greg Wells – producer, mixing
- Tyler Joseph – additional production
- Ian McGregor – recording
- Howie Weinberg, Dan Gerbarg – mastering
- Reel Bear Media, Virgilio Tzaj – art direction, design
- Reel Bear Media – photography
- Rob Gold – art manager
- Josh Skubel – packaging production

== Charts ==
=== Weekly charts ===
Weekly chart performance for Vessel
Chart (2013–2020)	Peak position
Australian Albums (ARIA)	51
Belgian Albums (Ultratop Flanders)	95
Belgian Albums (Ultratop Wallonia)	123
Canadian Albums (Billboard)	29
Dutch Albums (Album Top 100)	53
Finnish Albums (Suomen virallinen lista)	49
French Albums (SNEP)	92
Irish Albums (IRMA)	24
Italian Albums (FIMI)	91
Japanese Albums (Oricon)	62
Mexican Albums (AMPROFON)	1
New Zealand Albums (RMNZ)	16
Scottish Albums (Official Charts)	53
South Korean Albums (Gaon)	83
Swedish Albums (Sverigetopplistan)	60
UK Albums (Official Charts)	39
US Billboard 200	21
US Top Alternative Albums (Billboard)	4
US Indie Store Album Sales (Billboard)	8
US Top Rock Albums (Billboard)	6

=== Year-end charts ===
Year-end chart performance for Vessel
Chart (2015)	Position
US Billboard 200	119
US Catalog Albums (Billboard)	20
Chart (2016)	Position
Dutch Albums (MegaCharts)	93
UK Albums (OCC)	79
US Billboard 200	38
Chart (2017)	Position
US Billboard 200	74
US Top Rock Albums (Billboard)	12
Chart (2018)	Position
US Top Rock Albums (Billboard)	72

== Certifications ==
Certifications for Vessel
Region	Certification	Certified units/sales
Australia (ARIA)	Gold	35,000^{‡}
Canada (Music Canada)	2× Platinum	160,000^{‡}
Denmark (IFPI Danmark)	Gold	10,000^{‡}
Italy (FIMI)	Gold	25,000^{‡}
Netherlands (NVPI)	Gold	18,600^{‡}
New Zealand (RMNZ)	Platinum	15,000^{‡}
United Kingdom (BPI)	Platinum	300,000^{‡}
United States (RIAA)	2× Platinum	2,000,000^{‡}
^{‡} Sales+streaming figures based on certification alone.
