= Fake You Out =

Single by Twenty One Pilots

from the album Vessel
- Released: September 15, 2013
- Genre: Indietronica; pop rock
- Length: 3:51
- Label: Fueled by Ramen
- Songwriter: Tyler Joseph
- Producers: Greg Wells; Tyler Joseph (co.)

Twenty One Pilots singles chronology
| "House of Gold" (2013) | "Fake You Out" (2013) | "Car Radio" (2014) |

"Fake You Out" is a song written and recorded by American musical duo Twenty One Pilots from their third studio album, Vessel (2013). The song was written by Tyler Joseph, who co-produced it alongside Greg Wells. "Fake You Out" is a quirky techno-pop track composed of momentary injections of synth-pop and rapping, alongside record scratching and screams. Lyrically, it discusses the difficulty of telling people the truth about ourselves, while also referencing suicidal temptations.

The song was released as the album's fourth single on September 15, 2013 and was made available for free downloading as the Single of the Week through the iTunes Store in the United Kingdom. "Fake You Out" received generally favorable reviews from contemporary music critics. The single charted on Billboard's Christian Rock songs chart, peaking at number 21 and spending five weeks on it. It was also certified Gold by the Recording Industry Association of America (RIAA) for 500,000 units sold in the country. The band performed "Fake You Out" during their Quiet Is Violent World Tour (2014), as part of a medley with a cover version of "Summertime Sadness" by American singer Lana Del Rey.

== Recording ==
"I actually play the key tar on this song – my goal is to look cool every night when I play it but I fail miserably sometimes, it's a little challenge every night. It's definitely all over the place genre wise but that's the point I think. The bridge still catches me off guard, I sometimes even forget its coming when I play it live, I absolutely love that, that I as the songwriter and performer have to wrap my mind around what the song is doing. That's a freaking good song I think!"

—Joseph discussing the live performances of "Fake You Out".

"Fake You Out" was produced by Greg Wells and recorded at Rocket Carousel Studio in Los Angeles, California. The track was then mixed at Rocket Carousel Studio and mastered at Howie Weinberg Mastering in Los Angeles, California. During an interview with Rock Sound, Tyler Joseph provided insight into each track on the band's forthcoming album Vessel. He elaborated about how he played the key tar for "Fake You Out."

Joseph composed the track in F-sharp, the first note he learned to play on piano while using the black keys, because he considered it easier than the C note. Joseph stated that he was excited while writing the track, since he implemented on it many elements that he had not heard on music before. During the verses, he sings in falsetto; regarding this, he called this part one of his favorite melodies because he wanted to write a song that had verses as infectious as the chorus: "I feel like writers slack on verses when it comes to melody... I've always felt like why not have the verses—the melody of the verses be just as infectious as the chorus? So I'm proud of this song in that way". The vocalist also expressed that he tried to implement many musical genres in the song; he elaborated: "Also, it does the whole mash-up genre thing that everyone is freaking out about. Truly, I just didn't know that there were rules to songwriting and, you know, so I just worked on transitioning from one genre to the next. I wanted to hear a song that did that. I've never heard a song do that before, I wanna hear that, so I made that". Concerning the meaning of the lyrics, Joseph stated:

Lyrically, it just talks about what it talks about, you know. It's hard for me to explain it, but it's really about just putting a facade for people. I think about being on stage trying to look cool... just so the people think that like I'm worth listening to or something. The song kinda touches on how we constantly have to lie to people about who we really are, and it gets dangerous when you start lying to yourself. I like this song because it's a moment of honesty for me.

== Composition ==
"Fake You Out" is a techno-pop song that lasts three minutes and fifty-one seconds. According to the sheet music published at Musicnotes.com by Alfred Publishing Co., Inc, it is composed in the key of F-sharp major (F♯) and written in the time signature of common time, with a tempo of 115 beats per minute. The quirky track is composed of a hook, momentary injections of synth-pop and sharp rapping, alongside light showers of record scratching and screams. The musical arrangement has a pulsing beat at the bridge, and flirts with immediacy.

Lyrically, "Fake You Out" poignantly discusses the difficulty of telling people the truth about ourselves, even those whom we’re supposedly the most close to. Additionally, the song's lyrics reference suicidal temptations. The individually expressive song comes tinged with determined youth. "Fake You Out" maintains a dichotomy between managing to be both quirky and brutal. Similar to its title, "Fake You Out" feigns happiness with its beat, when it is actually a rather sad song lyrically: "I, I'll never be, be what you see inside."

== Release and promotion ==
In January 2013, Twenty One Pilots released third studio album Vessel as their major-label debut under Fueled By Ramen, including the single "Fake You Out." In the United Kingdom, the song was featured downloadable for free as the Single of the Week on iTunes. The free download offer was provided through the same platform in Netherlands in the week of October 13, 2013.

== Critical reception ==
"Fake You Out" received generally favorable reviews from contemporary music critics. AllMusic's Fred Thomas highlighted "Fake You Out" as an album track pick. He stated, "banging tunes like 'Fake You Out' leaning closer to Coldplay or Fun. than they do to MGMT, but with an eye toward both sides of the coin." Maria Sherman of Fuse remarked, "'Fake You Out" feels like a Killers tune with a purposeful-youth tinge; there's that pulsing beat on the bridge, and the immediacy they flirt with on other releases but comes full circle on Vessel."

== Commercial performance ==
"Fake You Out" charted on Billboard's Christian Rock songs chart during 2015, peaking at number 21 and spending five weeks on it. On February 27, 2019, "Fake You Out" was certified Gold by the Recording Industry Association of America (RIAA) for sales of over 500,000 paid digital downloads.

== Live performances ==
Twenty One Pilots provided a live rendidtion of "Fake You Out" before 5,000 fans at the Aragon Ballroom in Chicago, Illinois on October 2, 2014 during their Quiet Is Violent Tour. The closing performance was as part of a medley alongside a cover version of "Summertime Sadness" by American singer Lana Del Rey.

== Personnel ==
Credits adapted from the liner notes of Vessel.

Twenty One Pilots

- Tyler Joseph – lead vocals, bass guitar, composition, piano, keytar, co-production, programming, keyboards
- Josh Dun – drums, percussion

Additional musicians

- Greg Wells – production, mixing, programming, keyboards
- Howie Weinberg – mastering
- Dan Gerbarg – mastering

== Charts ==
=== Weekly charts ===
| Chart (2013) | Peak position |
|---|---|
| US Christian Rock Songs (Billboard) | 21 |

== Certifications ==
| Region | Certification | Certified units/sales |
|---|---|---|
| United States (RIAA) | Gold | 500,000^{‡} |
^{‡} Sales+streaming figures based on certification alone.

== Release history ==
| Country | Date | Format | Record label |
|---|---|---|---|
| Sweden | September 15, 2013 | Digital download | Fueled by Ramen |
| Norway | September 15, 2013 | Digital download | Fueled by Ramen |
| Denmark | September 15, 2013 | Digital download | Fueled by Ramen |
| Finland | September 15, 2013 | Digital download | Fueled by Ramen |
| United Kingdom | September 17, 2013 | Digital download | Fueled by Ramen |
| Netherlands | October 13, 2013 | Digital download | Fueled by Ramen |
