= Lovely (Twenty One Pilots song) =

Song written and recorded by Twenty One Pilots

Song by Twenty One Pilots

from the album Regional at Best
- Released: July 8, 2011
- Length: 4:20
- Label: Self-released
- Producer(s): Twenty One Pilots

"Lovely"

Single by Twenty One Pilots

from the album Vessel (Bonus Track Version)
- Released: April 17, 2013
- Recorded: 2011
- Genre: Electropop
- Length: 4:18
- Label: Warner Japan
- Songwriter(s): Tyler Joseph
- Producer(s): Greg Wells

Twenty One Pilots singles chronology
"Guns for Hands" (2012)	"Lovely" (2013)	"House of Gold" (2013)

Music video
- "Lovely" on YouTube

"Lovely" is a song written and recorded by American musical duo Twenty One Pilots. It was originally recorded for their second studio album, Regional at Best (2011), and was later re-recorded as a bonus track for their third album, Vessel (2013).

== Releases ==
It was originally featured on their self-released album Regional at Best, but was re-recorded for Vessel and included as a Japanese bonus track for the album. "Lovely" was released as a promotional single for the band's trip to Japan, being released on Warner Japan on April 17. The song thus peaked at number 67 on the Japan Hot 100 chart, finding moderate success in the country.

== Usage in media ==
"Lovely" appeared in a Japanese television advertisement called "Right-on" shortly before its release.

== Track listing ==
Digital download / stream
No.	Title	Length
1.	"Lovely"	4:18 (Note: Length for the promotional EP (new version). Original length is 4:20.)

== Charts ==
Chart (2013)	Peak position
Japan (Japan Hot 100) (Billboard)	67

== Release history ==
Region	Date	Format	Label
Japan	April 17, 2013	Digital download; stream	Warner
