= Car Radio (song) =

Twenty One Pilots song

Song by Twenty One Pilots

from the album Regional at Best
- Released: July 8, 2011
- Length: 4:49
- Producer: Twenty One Pilots

"Car Radio"

Single by Twenty One Pilots

from the album Vessel
- Released: March 18, 2014
- Genre: Alternative pop; rap rock; rave-hop; electronic rock
- Length: 4:27
- Label: Fueled by Ramen
- Songwriter: Tyler Joseph
- Producer: Greg Wells

Twenty One Pilots singles chronology
"Fake You Out" (2013)	"Car Radio" (2014)	"Fairly Local" (2015)

Music video
- "Car Radio" on YouTube

"Car Radio" is a song written and recorded by American musical duo Twenty One Pilots. Originally appearing on their second studio album Regional at Best (2011), it was re-recorded and released on March 18, 2014, as the sixth and final single from their third album, Vessel (2013). The song is notable for containing no chorus and no hook.

== Background ==
The song was inspired by an event which had happened to frontman Tyler Joseph during college. In an interview with Rock Sound, he explained that one day he arrived to class late and forgot to lock his car's door. After class, he returned to discover that someone had broken into his car and stolen everything inside, including the radio, GPS and his CDs. At the time, Joseph didn't have the finances necessary to afford to replace what was lost. The subsequent experience of going on without his car radio made him realize "music can act as a distraction and can get in the way of where your mind wants to go."

== Composition ==
According to the sheet music published at Musicnotes.com by Alfred Publishing, "Car Radio" is written in the time signature of common time, with a slow tempo of 65 beats per minute. "Car Radio" is composed in the key of A minor, while Tyler Joseph's vocal range spans one octave, from a low of C_{4} to a high of C_{5}. The song has a basic sequence of F–G–Am–G during the verses and interludes and follows Fmaj7–G_{6}–Am–G_{6} at the refrain as its chord progression. One of the band's more streamlined numbers, "Car Radio" starts off as a brooding alt-pop and rap rock anthem before exploding into existential rave-hop and electronic rock at its euphoric climax. Its musical composition has a song structure that is "way out in left field" due to the fact it contains no chorus and no hook. The song's verses talk about a true story of Tyler Joseph being late to a class at college and losing his car radio.

== Music video ==
The music video was uploaded to YouTube on April 19, 2013, and was directed by Mark C. Eshleman of Reel Bear Media. It was shot at a concert. Tyler Joseph sits in a bathroom singing the song, he then shaves off all of his hair, puts on a ski mask, and heads out to the stage where Josh Dun is seen playing drums. Joseph walks into the crowd which is standing still, and once Joseph jumps, the crowd jumps with him. Joseph surfs the crowd to the platform and performs the rest of the song on stage with Dun. As the song ends, Joseph is seen by himself on the stage and the crowd is gone. He takes off his mask, revealing his face once again (as well as his full head of hair, as if it were never shaven). Joseph then sings the final lyrics to the song, in which he falls backwards off the stage and the screen turns to black, ending the video.

As of January 2026, the video has garnered over 306 million views on YouTube.

== Live performances ==
On April 13, 2014, Twenty One Pilots performed the song at the 2014 MTV Movie Awards. On the 28th of the same month, the band performed the song on Late Night with Seth Meyers. They also performed the song at BBC Radio 1's Big Weekend 2016 on May 28. On June 9, 2022, the band performed a new version of the song in a mashup with "Heathens" at their MTV Unplugged performance.

== Personnel ==
- Tyler Joseph – lead vocals, guitar, piano, synthesizers, programming, keyboard, bass
- Josh Dun – drums, percussion

== Charts ==
=== Weekly charts ===
Chart (2014)	Peak position
US Bubbling Under Hot 100 (Billboard)	15
US Hot Rock & Alternative Songs (Billboard)	20
US Alternative Airplay (Billboard)	28
US Rock & Alternative Airplay (Billboard)	42
US Heatseeker Songs (Billboard)	22

=== Year-end charts ===
Chart (2014)	Position
US Hot Rock Songs (Billboard)	74

== Certifications ==
Region	Certification	Certified units/sales
Australia (ARIA)	Platinum	70,000^{‡}
Austria (IFPI Austria)	Gold	15,000^{*}
Canada (Music Canada)	2× Platinum	160,000^{‡}
New Zealand (RMNZ)	Platinum	30,000^{‡}
Portugal (AFP)	Gold	10,000^{‡}
United Kingdom (BPI)	Gold	400,000^{‡}
United States (RIAA)	3× Platinum	3,000,000^{‡}
^{*} Sales figures based on certification alone.^{‡} Sales+streaming figures based on certification alone.

== Release history ==
Region	Date	Format	Label
Worldwide	2010	Digital download; stream	self-released
Worldwide	March 18, 2014	Digital download · stream	Fueled by Ramen
