= Guns for Hands =

Twenty One Pilots song

Song by Twenty One Pilots

from the album Regional at Best
- Released: July 8, 2011
- Length: 4:37
- Label: Self-released
- Producer: Twenty One Pilots

"Guns for Hands"

Single by Twenty One Pilots

from the album Vessel
- Released: December 26, 2012
- Recorded: 2012
- Genre: Alternative rock; indie pop; electropop; conscious hip-hop; reggae
- Length: 4:33
- Label: Fueled By Ramen
- Songwriter: Tyler Joseph
- Producer: Greg Wells

Twenty One Pilots singles chronology
"Ode to Sleep" (2012)	"Guns for Hands" (2012)	"Lovely" (2013)

Music video
- "Guns for Hands" on YouTube

"Guns for Hands" is a song written and recorded by American musical duo Twenty One Pilots, recorded in Japan, and released worldwide. . It was originally recorded for their second studio album, Regional at Best (2011), and was later re-recorded for their third album Vessel (2013), their 2012 extended play Three Songs, and their 2013 extended play Migraine. The song's accompanying music video was directed by Mark C. Eshleman. The song was heavily promoted in Japan as part of the duo's concert tour through the country and experienced moderate success there, reaching number 21 on the country's Hot 100 chart.

== Background ==
In an interview with Rock Sound, Tyler Joseph explained that "Guns for Hands" came about following a meeting after a show with young fans of the band who discussed "what it was they were going through and a lot of what they were going through had to do with suicide", and added that "thank goodness it had a lot to do with them overcoming it and using music and songs, in particular his songs, to help them get over that." Joseph was consequently inspired to write a track "about taking that negative energy and aiming it at something else, not aiming it at yourself."

== Music video ==
The music video for "Guns for Hands" is shot in a large, empty white room, set aside for the performers and their instruments. The beginning of the video also shows the song's title in Japanese, as well as some subtitles. Joseph wears a blue shirt, and Dun wears a red shirt, representing the band's early logo. The video opens with Joseph putting on a ski mask and then offering another mask to a withdrawn Dun, whispering "They won't know it's you." The two launch into an energetic performance, with Joseph regularly bringing attention to the fact that his microphone is not actually recording his voice by swinging it around and rubbing it against his forehead. As well as that, Joseph would often shake and twitch throughout the video. Prior to the rap verse, both performers wrap colored duct tape around their faces, creating makeshift masks that they remove prior to the final chorus.

== Track listing ==
Digital download / stream
No.	Title	Length
1.	"Guns for Hands"	4:33

EP
No.	Title	Length
1.	"Guns for Hands"	4:33
2.	"Forest"	4:06

== Personnel ==
- Tyler Joseph – vocals, piano, bass guitar, guitar, synthesizers, keyboards, programming
- Josh Dun – drums, percussion, backing vocals

== Charts ==
Chart (2013)	Peak position
Japan Hot 100 (Billboard)	21
Mexican Ingles Airplay (Billboard)	4

== Certifications ==
Region	Certification	Certified units/sales
United States (RIAA)	Platinum	1,000,000^{‡}
^{‡} Sales+streaming figures based on certification alone.
