= Twenty One Pilots (album) =

2009 debut studio album by Twenty One Pilots

Studio album by Twenty One Pilots
- Released: December 29, 2009
- Recorded: 2009
- Studios: Tyler Joseph's home studio, Columbus, Ohio
- Genre: Emo
- Length: 62:08
- Label: Self-released

Twenty One Pilots chronology
Twenty One Pilots (2009)	Regional at Best (2011)

Twenty One Pilots (Note: Stylized twenty | one | pilots) is the debut studio album by American band Twenty One Pilots, released independently on December 29, 2009. It is the band's only album to feature founding members Nick Thomas and Chris Salih, who both departed the group in 2011.

== Background and production ==
Tyler Joseph met Chris Salih at a party during his time at Ohio State University, who offered to play music with Joseph. They formed the band with Salih playing drums. Later, Nick Thomas was invited by Joseph to join the band as a bassist. In 2009, the group moved into a house of their own and started working on their first album. Joseph was primarily in charge of the songwriting with input provided by other band members. The album was recorded in the basement studio. Due to the low budget for making the album, instead of recording real instrumentals, most of the drum beats were programmed with computer software.

The album cover art was designed by John Rettstatt, a friend of Joseph.

== Release and promotion ==
The album was released in December 2009. After the release, the band began touring Ohio. Their initial marketing was grassroots; Joseph's mother would stand outside of Ohio State University, giving away tickets to their shows. During this time, the band participated in various "Battle of the Bands" contests at The Alrosa Villa and The Basement, important Columbus music venues.

== Commercial performance ==
The album debuted on the US Billboard 200 in January 2016, months after the band's 2015 album Blurryface was released, peaking at No. 139 on the chart in January 2017. According to Billboard's data in July 2016, the album had sold 115,000 copies. It was certified Gold by RIAA in 2025, for sales of 500,000.

== Reception ==
Professional ratings
Review scores
Source	Rating
AllMusic	3/5 stars
Sputnikmusic	4.5/5

Despite ranking as the lowest of the band's albums in a list for Kerrang!, Emily Carter considered that "the quality of the songwriting here is already superb", praising Joseph's lyrics, and concluded that "these aren't chart-topping bangers, sure, but the impact of these songs cannot be understated". Maria Sherman of Fuse praised Joseph's "speak-singing" and the "beautiful piano arrangements" on the album, though criticized his enunciation while rapping. Alternative Press described "Addict with a Pen" as "slow, spare, and nakedly honest" and "the best representation of what initially drew fans to the band".

== Track listing ==
All tracks are written by Tyler Joseph.

No.	Title	Length
1.	"Implicit Demand for Proof"	4:52
2.	"Fall Away"	3:02
3.	"The Pantaloon"	3:34
4.	"Addict with a Pen"	4:47
5.	"Friend, Please"	4:13
6.	"March to the Sea"	5:32
7.	"Johnny Boy"	4:39
8.	"Oh, Ms. Believer"	3:37
9.	"Air Catcher"	4:13
10.	"Trapdoor"	4:37
11.	"A Car, a Torch, a Death"	4:34
12.	"Taxi Cab"	4:46
13.	"Before You Start Your Day"	3:53
14.	"Isle of Flightless Birds"	5:46
Total length:		62:08

== Personnel ==
- Tyler Joseph – vocals, keyboards, synthesizers, programming, songwriting, production (all tracks)
- Nick Thomas – bass (tracks 1, 4–7, 9–10, 12), guitar (tracks 9 and 11); backing vocals (track 9); keyboards, programming, arrangement (all tracks)
- Chris Salih – electronic drums (tracks 1, 4–10, 12), backing vocals (tracks 9); recording, engineering, production, arrangement (all tracks)
- John Rettstatt – album art

== Charts ==
Chart performance for Twenty One Pilots
Chart (2016–2017)	Peak position
UK Independent Albums (OCC)	49
US Billboard 200	139

== Certifications ==
Certifications for twenty one pilots
Region	Certification	Certified units/sales
United States (RIAA)	Gold	500,000^{‡}
^{‡} Sales+streaming figures based on certification alone.
