= Ode to Sleep =

Twenty One Pilots song

Song by Twenty One Pilots

from the album Regional at Best
- Released: July 8, 2011
- Length: 5:14
- Label: Self-released
- Songwriter: Tyler Joseph
- Producer: Twenty One Pilots

"Ode to Sleep"

Promotional single by Twenty One Pilots

from the album Vessel
- Released: 2013
- Studio: Rocket Carousel (Los Angeles)
- Genre: Indie rock; hip hop; pop punk; rap rock; rock
- Length: 5:07
- Label: Fueled by Ramen
- Producer: Greg Wells

Music video
- "Ode to Sleep" on YouTube

"Ode to Sleep" is a song by American musical duo Twenty One Pilots. Originally recorded and self-released for their second studio album, Regional at Best (2011), the song was later re-recorded for their third album, Vessel (2013) as a promotional single.

== Background ==
Regarding the creation of the song, Joseph states that he did not know "exactly how it happened" or "what he was thinking about", but was satisfied with the final result. One of his favorite songs to bring on stage, he defines Ode to Sleep "a puzzle because of its particular structure and how it accidentally manages to be together".

With regard to the song title, Joseph said:

The first track on Vessel is called Ode to Sleep and I remember back when I was first trying to name the song, we actually played it live first before it was named, and this is back when we had kind of a small following in our hometown and it was small enough that everyone got to write on a piece of paper and put into a bucket it which name they wanted the song to be named. One was Ode to Sleep – I honestly forget the other names of the songs – but it was cool because a hometown audience got to name the song.

Veteran member Chris Salih said that they "played [Ode to Sleep] to have that song named," during a time in which the band was without a label and they could perform new songs when they wanted to. The song was first performed on October 1, 2010, at the Newport Music Hall, roughly eight months before the release of the sophomore album Regional at Best. Salih said three jars were placed on the band's merchandise table where concertgoers could vote on the song's name. The names were pre-chosen by the band, but the band members have since forgotten the other two names.

Joseph has also said:

I liked putting this song first on the album, because it kinda puts the listener through kind of a song structure boot camp, if you will, when it comes to them being able to anticipate what the rest of the album is. So Ode to Sleep is definitely one that we like to intro with, we open up a lot of our sets with this song and I’m really proud of how weird it is.

== Production ==
The song was written by Tyler Joseph and produced by Twenty One Pilots for Regional at Best.

After teaming up with Fueled by Ramen and a production staff of higher caliber, Greg Wells helped produce the version to appear on Vessel. Like the rest of the album, it was recorded at the Rocket Carousel Studio in Los Angeles, California.

== Release ==
"Ode to Sleep" originally appears on the Twenty One Pilots album Regional at Best. Next it makes an appearance on Twenty One Pilots' Three Songs EP alongside Regional at Best song "Guns for Hands" and "Migraine". In 2017, all three tracks were certified gold by the RIAA and over 500,000 copies were sold individually.

It was then re-recorded on account of Twenty One Pilots teaming up with Fueled by Ramen and placed on Twenty One Pilots' third album Vessel as its album opener.

During the "Quiet Is Violent Tour", a brief poem entitled "Only Skeleton Bones Remain" would precede the performance of this song.

== Critical reception ==
Dan LeRoy of Alternative Press deems the song Twenty One Pilots' best, stating that "If one single track best incorporates all the elements that have made Twenty One Pilots beloved, 'Ode to Sleep' would be it. A manic, tempo-shifting mashup of hip-hop swagger and indie-rock doubt, with a heart-stopping pop chorus designed to drive demons away."

Mitch Mosk of Atwood Magazine compared the song's pre-chorus to Electric Light Orchestra's "Mr. Blue Sky." According to Mosk, the song's beginning is primarily electronic with rapping similar to Eminem, whereas the song has a "full-blown indie-pop chorus, with jingling piano keys and rock drums." Ultimately, he attributes the appeal of the song to the (genre-swapping) disparity of the "impressive rapping" and "anthemic pop chorus' emotional release."

== Music video ==
On December 31, 2014, the band released a music video for the song "Ode to Sleep". Composed of footage captured by the band's creative director Mark C. Eshleman of Reel Bear Media from three concerts from the past three years, the video depicted the band's rapid growth from their origins as a small local band to a nationally popular alternative act, an upward trend that would continue into the next album cycle. Eshleman then went on to direct the music video, along with most of the band's others from 2012 to 2015, and again from 2019 to the present day with his recent involvements in Clancy (2024) and Breach (2025).

It was revealed that a skeptical Eshleman had pulled Joseph aside a few times before the shooting at the empty venue, questioning whether the small crowd was even worth filming. Joseph insisted and the music video has since garnered over 27 million views.

== Personnel ==
- Tyler Joseph – vocals, guitar, bass, keyboards, piano, synthesizer, programming
- Josh Dun – drums, percussion

=== Other musicians ===
- Greg Wells – keyboard, synthesizer, programming ("Vessel" version)

== Certifications ==
Region	Certification	Certified units/sales
United States (RIAA)	Platinum	1,000,000^{‡}
^{‡} Sales+streaming figures based on certification alone.
