= Regional at Best =

Studio album by Twenty One Pilots
- Released: July 8, 2011
- Length: 63:09
- Label: Self-released
- Producer: Twenty One Pilots

Twenty One Pilots chronology
Twenty One Pilots (2009)	Regional at Best (2011)	Vessel (2013)

Regional at Best is the second studio album by the American band Twenty One Pilots, and its first as the core duo of Tyler Joseph and Josh Dun. The album was self-released on July 8, 2011, and was the band's final independent record before being signed to Fueled by Ramen in 2012, having since been discontinued and put out of print.

Several critics compared Regional at Best to the band's 2009 self-titled debut album and felt that it set a new basis for the style and tone of future albums, with an increased dependence on electronics and synthesizer. The songs "Car Radio", "Holding On to You", "Guns for Hands", "Ode to Sleep", and "Trees" were re-recorded for Twenty One Pilots' next album, their 2013 major-label debut, Vessel. A rarity in the band's catalog, Alternative Press has reported that Regional at Best remains beloved by the band's fans, with many hoping for a reprint.

== Background and development ==
Twenty One Pilots was formed in 2009 by high school friends Tyler Joseph and Nick Thomas, as well as Chris Salih. The trio built a regional following across Ohio and the Midwest with constant and energetic touring, shrewd use of interactive social media, and connecting with fans on a grassroots level. They self-released their eponymous debut album of what Neil Z. Yeung of AllMusic characterized as rap-infused, high-tech pop in December 2009 before Thomas and Salih left the band in 2011. Frontman Tyler Joseph recruited replacement drummer Josh Dun before the release of Regional at Best and Twenty One Pilots continued as a duo.

According to Ali Shutler of Alternative Press, as the band shifted lineups, Twenty One Pilots effectively became Joseph's solo project by the time Regional at Best was made. Joseph described Regional at Best in an interview with HuffPost as something he did himself and a "glorified mixtape that we used as a background to solidifying fans". He described the recording process: "I sat down in my studio, and man, I cranked out songs", noting that he didn't "know the ins and outs of being a professional engineer". Joseph would put together a song's music, using replacement and MIDI to help him find the sound he was looking for, and then lay down vocals. Like Twenty One Pilots' 2009 self-titled record, Regional at Best consisted of 14 songs recorded unprofessionally in a home studio.

== Composition ==
Neil Z. Yeung of AllMusic felt that the album contained hints of Twenty One Pilots' "genre-busting style that became their calling card in the years that followed". Tyler White of Sputnikmusic said that Regional at Best saw Twenty One Pilots take a new approach to their sound, writing that the crossover of pop, rock and alternative was still present from the first album with increase in dependence on electronics and synths, experimenting deeper into the realm of pop/alternative and utilizing the synths as the overall melodies of the album. White found that changing keys are often a definitive attribute of the album.

Regional at Best was the first album from Twenty One Pilots as the core duo of Joseph and Dun. White noticed an exponential increase of drumming with the addition of Dun, adding more complexity to the mix and enhancing the groove exhibited throughout the album by utilizing quick hi-hat bursts, fitting fills, and experimentation in tom driven beats complimented by Joseph's lyrics, vocals, and rapping. White wrote that Joseph's lyrics call out to others "on a personal level, asking questions of identity, fear, and human nature when brought upon troubling circumstances", while his vocals in choruses hit higher notes and embrace wider diversity in range compared to the former self-titled album. White said that the album shows an ironically happy sound and wrote that the album's songs generally follow the same composition of beats, with synths providing harmony in the background and sometimes leading the musical assault, and an underlying bass groove backing up the melodies.

== Songs ==
"Guns for Hands" is a hopeful indie-pop anthem on the topic of suicide which cleveland.com called "oddly happy-sounding". Alternative Press wrote that the song features a bouncing reggae vibe the duo would explore in greater detail on Blurryface (2015). It was noted by White for Dun's drumming skill alongside the next track, "Holding On to You", which Alternative Press thought fully realized the elements of the band's character, musical methodology and pop sensibility. The song was described by cleveland.com as an "emotional force of nature that Tyler Joseph clung to during one of the toughest times in his career", and it subsequently became the first single from Vessel (2013). The five-minute "Ode to Sleep" opens with fast paced raps over a hard electronic beat before switching into pop-punk, blending dark lyricism with buoyant instrumentals and a building beat. It was described by cleveland.com as the "ultimate Twenty One Pilots track" and "essentially two songs combined in one", whilst White mentioned that it contained one of Joseph's best rap performances in the band's history. Alternative Press thought that the song captured Twenty One Pilots "at a turning point, signaling that they were entering another level", and was re-recorded as the opener of Vessel.

"Slowtown" was criticized by Alternative Press for Joseph sounding "like he came in third in the local Killers karaoke contest every Thursday in Columbus". "Car Radio" is an "uncanny mix of alt-pop and electronic hip-hop" which features a piano driving its progressions and a rave instrumental section. The song launched the band into the mainstream when it was recorded for Vessel, earning them a performance slot at the 2014 MTV Movie Awards. According to White, the songs "Forest" and "Glowing Eyes" apply the use of higher keys and layered vocals, giving an upbeat note to melancholy lyrics. The former was described as "pop-tastic existentialism" by Alternative Press, highlighting the lyrics "Hands held higher/We'll be on fire/Singing songs that nobody wrote" as presenting a more troubled worldview towards humanity than that of death metal bands. It features a rap performance by Joseph which White praised. "Glowing Eyes" has Joseph singing lower registers in the verses while tacking higher ranges in the chorus. Lyrically, the "sugary sweet" song talks about stamping out depressive thoughts and was named "one of the band's happiest-sounding releases" by cleveland.com. Alternative Press called the song "A premature take on growing old (and possibly death)", comparing it with Blurryface's "Stressed Out".

A "starkly unique offering" from early Twenty One Pilots, "Kitchen Sink" features "a dynamic blend of Joseph's vocals and layered instrumentals", with erhu violin and "synth boops" in its instrumentation, lush choruses, as well as a verse from Tyler Joseph's "lightning-tongued" brother Zack summarizing that the space in the head only gets weirder to navigate as you get older. According to White, it features Twenty One Pilots' "rooted downcast mood" and leaves the listener questioning his motives of Joseph's writing, wondering whether his mind is okay and what he means. "Kitchen Sink" has garnered speculation on its meaning; a common consensus is that sinks are a dumping ground, and the song represents that emotionally. Yeung said that the song features some of the deepest lyrics in the band's catalog, and Alternative Press considered it one of Regional at Best's many standouts as well as a fan favorite. A performance of "Kitchen Sink" was included in a 2017 compilation of Joseph's best live vocals.

"Anathema" was called "possibly the most underrated breakup song of the last 10 years" by Alternative Press, complimenting its sentiment, while "Lovely" was criticized for Joseph's use of a vocoder. "Ruby" is Joseph's ode to a girl at his church with down syndrome which features frantic sequencer parts and unhinged screaming that Alternative Press called "truly something for new listeners to behold". Yeung called "Ruby" a "heartwarming ode" worth seeking out by fans.

"Trees" is Twenty One Pilots' signature show-ending song; its build climbs a catchy synth melody with singalong lyrics into an "explosive, powerful punctuation mark". Alternative Press called it "as celebratory as a high school pep rally, your favorite sports team winning a championship and the last time you were kissed really hard. All at once." "Be Concerned" marks a return to the band's "downcast mood" and features a verse from Columbus MC Jocef. Alternative Press opined that, given the song's pop-crossover potential, it was curious that it didn't get a placement on Vessel. The final track on Regional at Best, "Clear", includes a synthesizer intro that "could've been lifted off a Mindless Self Indulgence LP" and a chorus ending with a "vibe similar to My Chemical Romance's 'Famous Last Words'". Alternative Press called it "an exclamation point to the higher-profiled adventures Joseph and Dun would embark on."

== Release and promotion ==
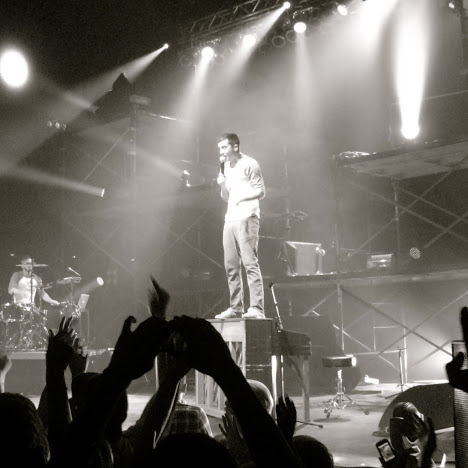
Twenty One Pilots performing at the LC Pavilion on April 28, 2012

Regional at Best was self-released independently on July 8, 2011; Twenty One Pilots paid a company to print the CDs and had them ready for people to buy at shows at their merch table. Dun explained in a 2023 variety stream that the band put out their independent records so that they would have music to play live: "At that time, we were kinda like, 'Let's just put something together – that way we can play shows.' And so it wasn't a professionally recorded record; it was really just material to go and play." Joseph added that Regional at Best was "Something for people to buy to get enough gas money to get to the next show!" The album's title was in reference to Twenty One Pilots' popularity in Ohio compared to everywhere else, with twelve people having shown up to their first out-of-state show in June 2011. According to cleveland.com, Joseph was contemplating giving up on music around the time of Regional at Best's release.

Twenty One Pilots expanded their audience with a series of videos made by their friend Mark Eshleman and caught the attention of major labels as their brand grew; they signed to Fueled by Ramen in 2012, at the time when they had already released Regional at Best. As such, Regional at Best was the band's final independent record. Twenty One Pilots had written more songs when they were ready to release their first professionally-done, major-label record, Vessel, through Fueled by Ramen. They were asked by the label if they wanted to release Regional at Best as it was or get the album remastered but declined, instead taking songs from the album to re-record for Vessel alongside their new tracks.

The Regional at Best songs "Ode to Sleep", "Holding On to You", "Car Radio", "Guns for Hands", and "Trees" were re-recorded for Vessel, featuring much of the same programming and vocals. (Note: Joseph elaborated in his 2013 interview with HuffPost, "The vocals to 'Holding On to You' were ones that I recorded in my basement before we ever got signed or anything, so we were able to take those files and put them where they needed to be in the mix.") Yeung cited behind-the-scenes details related to song rights and distribution for why Regional at Best was discontinued, with Ali Shutler of Alternative Press saying some of the tracks had been "pretty much removed from the internet entirely" and that "the mystery means physical copies of the record now sell for a few hundred dollars". Kerrang!'s Emily Carter wrote that a listener has to "resort to YouTube to hear the likes of 'Slowtown', 'Anathema' and 'Clear'." Billboard reported in 2016 that the album sold 3,000 copies and has been out of print since 2012.

On July 6, 2017, several posts from Twenty One Pilots' social media accounts containing the image of a red eye contained abstruse lyrical messages from Regional at Best, Vessel and Blurryface, which teased their next record, Trench (2018). In an October 8, 2018 Reddit AMA giving insight on the recently released Trench, a user asked if Regional at Best would ever see an official re-release, to which the band responded "Regional of what?", leaving its probability unpromising. On February 3, 2023, Twenty One Pilots released a Vessel tenth anniversary deluxe box set, which included the Regional at Best songs "Forest", "Glowing Eyes", "Kitchen Sink", and "Lovely" on Side D.

== Critical reception ==
Professional ratings
Review scores
Source	Rating
AllMusic	3.5/5 stars
Mezzic	8.6/10
Sputnikmusic	4.0/5

Neil Z. Yeung of AllMusic called Regional at Best an "oddity" in the duo's catalog and "a fun rarity worth seeking out for hardcore fans". Yeung felt that it was nice to enjoy the album's tracks "without the weight of the mythology that began to take shape with their 2015 breakthrough, Blurryface" and wrote that Regional at Best is "a special one – if it can be found." Sputnikmusic's Tyler White called the album "pretty great" and felt that it contained some of Joseph's best rap performances in the band's history and provided a new basis for the style and tone of future albums, but also that the album was "a step down in many ways" from Twenty One Pilots' debut and that a lot of the songs sounded underproduced compared to their reworkings on Vessel, leaning "more towards a demo album for almost half of the songs". In White's review for Vessel, White called both Regional at Best and Twenty One Pilots "quite amazing, underrated albums". Mezzic writer Ryan G acclaimed the album, stating that "Regional at Best is essentially a group of 14 glorified demos. One would never know it though, from the professionalism we hear."

Ranking Twenty One Pilots' albums in 2021, Kerrang! writer Emily Carter considered Regional at Best to be Twenty One Pilots' fifth-best album out of the six they had released at the time, placing the album above its self-titled debut. Carter wrote that the album features "layers upon layers of experimental genius to uncover" and desired a re-release. It was ranked sixth by Ali Shutler of Alternative Press in 2022, who said that the record may have provided the blueprint for what the band would become but was "perhaps the only Twenty One Pilots album that can be described as a work in progress" and thought that all of its better moments were re-recorded for Vessel. In 2018, Alessandra Rincón of Billboard regarded Regional at Best's simplicity as its unique element among Twenty One Pilots albums. Alternative Press noted in 2018 that many fans still hoped for a Regional at Best reprint, and in a 2024 fan poll that the album was "totally beloved within Twenty One Pilots' canon".

== Track listing ==
All tracks are written by Tyler Joseph, except where noted.

No.	Title	Writer(s)	Length
1.	"Guns for Hands"		4:37
2.	"Holding On to You"	Tyler Joseph, Maurice Gleaton, Charles Hammond, Robert Hill, Deangelo Hunt, Bernard Leverette, Gerald Tiller, Jamall Willingham	4:26
3.	"Ode to Sleep"		5:13
4.	"Slowtown"		4:57
5.	"Car Radio"		4:49
6.	"Forest"		4:11
7.	"Glowing Eyes"		4:26
8.	"Kitchen Sink"		5:34
9.	"Anathema"		3:59
10.	"Lovely"		4:20
11.	"Ruby"		4:30
12.	"Trees"		4:20
13.	"Be Concerned"		4:08
14.	"Clear"		3:38
Total length:			63:09

A limited digital version included two bonus tracks, "House of Gold" & "Two"

== Personnel ==
Adapted from the CD liner notes.

Twenty One Pilots

- Tyler Joseph
- Josh Dun

Credit:

- Zack Joseph – performance on "Kitchen Sink"
- Jocef – performance on "Be Concerned"
- James Truslow – performance on "Glowing Eyes" (uncredited)

Artwork

- Album art designed by Reel Bear Media
