= The Yorkshire Times =

Digital newspaper

- Format: Online newspaper
- Editor: Angela Boddy
- Founded: 1 October 2011
- Headquarters: The British School, Otley Road, Skipton
- Website: The Yorkshire Times

The Yorkshire Times is an online newspaper founded in 2011 by Richard Trinder, and the sole online-only paper in Yorkshire.

Rather than employing journalists, The Yorkshire Times focuses instead on citizen journalism, with opinion, commentary and analysis prevailing over simply reporting local events. As of 1 January 2014, the newspaper receives 35,000 unique readers and 500,000 reads per month.

== History ==
The newspaper was founded in October 2011 by Richard Trinder, who was 'fed up' with the regional and local printed newspapers on offer in Yorkshire.

In April 2012, the newspaper launched its first ever live blog, covering the 18th Bradford International Film Festival, with resulting coverage of other festivals around the county, including the Great Yorkshire Show.

The newspaper has also secured interviews with several notable names, including Chancellor of the Exchequer George Osborne, Bob Geldof, Alan Davies and Claire Cashmore.

== Contributors ==
The Yorkshire Times is home to a number of writers – including core contributors such as the news editor Steve James along with the arts editor Phil Hopkins. There are also many other writers – all of whom supply the newspaper with a selection of topics – ranging from current business developments to reviews of the latest film releases.

The newspaper encourages writers from all over Yorkshire to contribute and express their opinion. They aim to represent the skills and talents of people across Yorkshire along with expressing the diversity of the population. Through their regional news the Yorkshire Times provides their readers with up-to-date information that previously would have been inaccessible – each day new articles are added to the paper, providing of constant stream of information that's relevant to the area.

== Content ==
The site offers sections on Yorkshire news, business, sci-tech, lifestyle, arts, jobs, cars, sports, family, food and what's on in the local area. They also provide a newsletter sign-up and a live stream of their Twitter feed. The paper has an active Social Media programme meaning they regularly update their Twitter, Facebook, Pinterest and Google+ accounts allowing them to communicate with their audience through multi-channels, which in turn increases their readership and presence as an online newspaper.

== Advertising ==
As the newspaper is not sold in paper copies, The Yorkshire Times gain their funding through advertising support. This means businesses pay the newspaper to have their advertisement placed on a page – either in the form of a static or animated image. The Yorkshire Times aims to choose businesses that are local or regional offering products and services that are reflective of the style of the newspaper, whilst also making sure the overriding ethos of the paper is kept intact.
