= List of awards and nominations received by Jisoo =

Jisoo awards and nominations
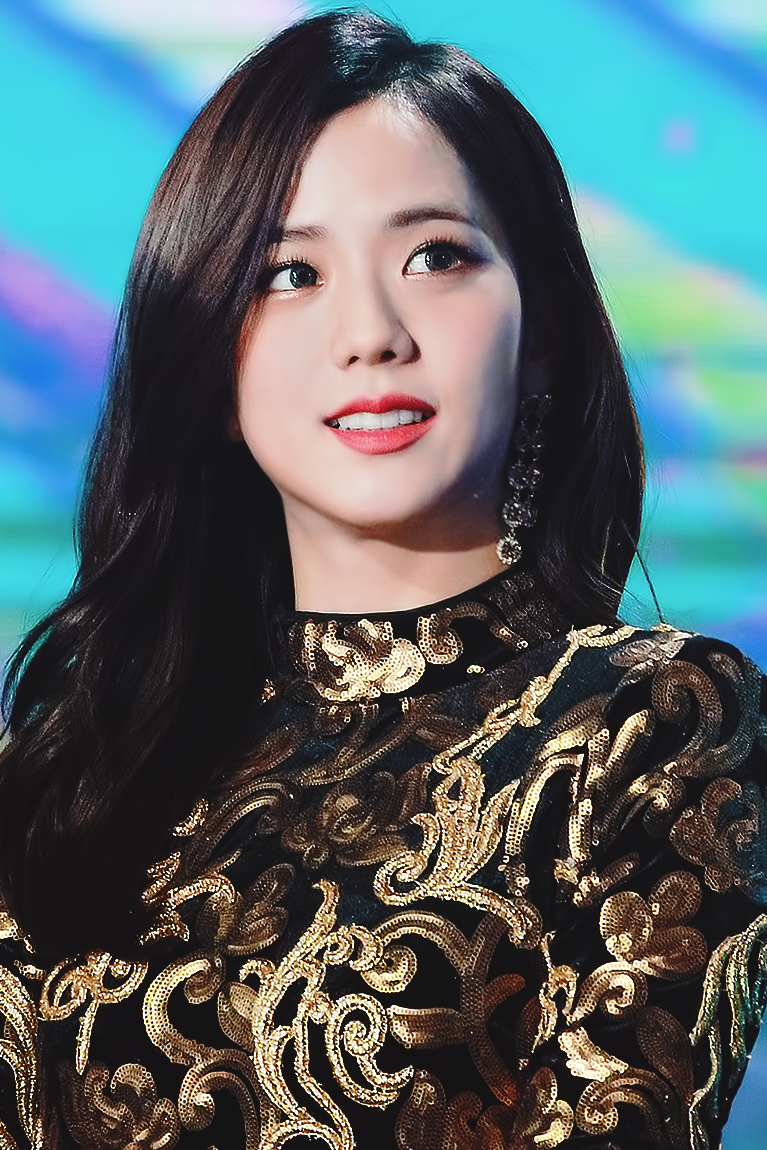
- Jisoo at the 33rd Golden Disc Awards in January 2019
Awards and nominations
Award	Wins	Nominations
Acervo Awards	1	1
APAN Star Awards	0	1
Asia Artist Awards	0	5
Asia Star Entertainer Awards	1	4
Asian Pop Music Awards	5	12
Brand of the Year Awards	2	2
BreakTudo Awards	0	3
Cannes International Series Festival	1	1
Circle Chart Awards	1	4
D Awards	0	3
DDU Awards	1	1
The Fact Music Awards	0	3
Golden Disc Awards	2	3
Hanteo Music Awards	0	13
iHeartRadio Music Awards	0	2
K-World Dream Awards	0	2
KM Chart Awards	0	2
Korea Drama Awards	0	1
Korea First Brand Awards	1	1
Korea Grand Music Awards	0	4
MAMA Awards	3	10
Melon Music Awards	0	4
MTV Video Music Awards	0	2
Music Awards Japan	0	1
SEC Awards	1	3
Seoul International Drama Awards	3	3
Seoul Music Awards	0	10
UK Music Video Awards	0	2
Weibo Starlight Awards	1	1

Totals (Note: Certain award groups do not simply award one winner. They acknowledge several different recipients, have runners-up, and have third place. Since this is a specific recognition and is different from losing an award, runner-up mentions are considered wins in this award tally. For simplification and to avoid errors, each award in this list has been presumed to have had a prior nomination.)
- Wins: 23
- Nominations: 103

Jisoo is a South Korean singer and actress and a member of the South Korean girl group Blackpink. She played her first lead acting role in the 2021–22 television series Snowdrop, for which she won Outstanding Korean Actress at the 17th Seoul International Drama Awards, Best New Actress at the 2nd DDU Awards, and Best Actress in a Series at the Acervo Awards. Her subsequent leading role in the 2025 television series Newtopia garnered her the award for Outstanding Asian Star (South Korea) at the 20th Seoul International Drama Awards. In 2026, Jisoo received the Madame Figaro Rising Star Award at the Cannes International Series Festival, becoming the first Asian actress to win the award. For her leading role in the 2026 television series Boyfriend on Demand, Jisoo won Outstanding Asian Star (South Korea) at the 21st Seoul International Drama Awards.

Jisoo released her debut solo single "Flower" in March 2023, which won the Best Digital Song bonsang (Note: A bonsang (Korean: 본상), which translates to "main prize", is a major award given at a South Korean award ceremony to multiple artists.) at the 38th Golden Disc Awards, where she was also awarded Most Popular Female Artist. At the 2023 MAMA Awards, she won Best Female Artist, while "Flower" won Best Music Video and Best Dance Performance Female Solo. Jisoo earned the daesang (Note: A daesang (Korean: 대상), which translates to "grand prize", is the highest honor given out at South Korean music award ceremonies in recognition of the artist(s) with the greatest physical and digital achievements for the year.) for Female Solo Singer of the Year at the 2023 Brand of the Year Awards as well as Artist of the Year – Global Streaming at the 13th Circle Chart Music Awards. "Flower" garnered nominations for Song of the Year at the 38th Golden Disc Awards, 2023 MAMA Awards, and 2023 Melon Music Awards, and Best Music Video at the 2024 iHeartRadio Music Awards. In 2025, Jisoo released her debut extended play Amortage and its lead single "Earthquake", which received a nomination for Best K-Pop at the 2025 MTV Video Music Awards. She won The Best Female Solo at the 2025 Asia Star Entertainer Awards and Female Solo Singer of the Year (Vietnam) at the 2025 Brand of the Year Awards. Jisoo earned placements on Forbes's Korea Power Celebrity 40 in 2025-2026 and K-Idol of the Year 30 in 2025, and was named one of the Asia-Pacific U30 Outstanding Young Leaders by the Asia-Pacific Entrepreneurs Association at APEC South Korea 2025.

== Awards and nominations ==
Name of the award ceremony, year presented, category, nominee(s) of the award, and the result of the nomination
Award ceremony	Year	Category	Nominee(s)/work(s)	Result	Ref.
Acervo Awards	2022	Best Actress in a Series	Snowdrop	Won	
APAN Star Awards	2025	Global Star Award	Jisoo	Nominated	
Asia Artist Awards	2023	Popularity Award – Singer (Female)	Jisoo	Nominated	
Asia Artist Awards	2024	Popularity Award – Singer (Female)	Jisoo	Nominated	
Asia Artist Awards	2025	Popularity Award – Actress	Jisoo	Nominated	
Asia Artist Awards	2025	Popularity Award – Solo (Female)	Jisoo	Nominated	
Asia Artist Awards	2026	Popularity Award – Solo (Female)	Jisoo	Pending	
Asia Star Entertainer Awards	2024	The Best Solo (Female)	Jisoo	Nominated	
Asia Star Entertainer Awards	2025	The Best Solo (Female)	Jisoo	Won	
Asia Star Entertainer Awards	2026	Fan Choice Couple	Boyfriend on Demand (with Seo In-guk)	Nominated	
Asia Star Entertainer Awards	2026	The Best Actress	Jisoo	Nominated	
Asian Pop Music Awards	2023	Best Female Artist (Overseas)	Jisoo	Won	
Asian Pop Music Awards	2023	Song of the Year (Overseas)	"Flower"	Won	
Asian Pop Music Awards	2023	Top 20 Songs of the Year (Overseas)	"Flower"	Won	
Asian Pop Music Awards	2023	People's Choice Award (Overseas)	Me	4th place	
Asian Pop Music Awards	2023	Best Dance Performance (Overseas)	"Flower"	Nominated	
Asian Pop Music Awards	2023	Best Music Video (Overseas)	"Flower"	Nominated	
Asian Pop Music Awards	2025	Top 20 Songs of the Year	"Earthquake"	Won	
Asian Pop Music Awards	2025	People's Choice Award	Amortage	Nominated	
Asian Pop Music Awards	2025	Best Collaboration	"Eyes Closed" (with Zayn)	Nominated	
Asian Pop Music Awards	2025	Best Dance Performance	"Earthquake"	Nominated	
Asian Pop Music Awards	2025	Best Female Artist	Jisoo	Nominated	
Asian Pop Music Awards	2025	Song of the Year	"Earthquake"	Nominated	
Brand of the Year Awards (Note: Established in 2003, the Brand of the Year Awards is an awards ceremony based on nationwide surveys hosted by the Korea Consumer Brand Committee and organized by the Korea Consumer Forum.)	2023	Female Solo Singer	Jisoo	Won	
Brand of the Year Awards	2025	Female Solo Singer (Vietnam)	Jisoo	Won	
BreakTudo Awards	2023	International Hit	"Flower"	Nominated	
BreakTudo Awards	2025	Asian Artist	Jisoo	Nominated	
BreakTudo Awards	2026	International Collaboration of the Year	"Eyes Closed" (with Zayn)	Pending	
Cannes International Series Festival	2026	Madame Figaro Rising Star Award	Jisoo	Won	
Circle Chart Music Awards	2024	Artist of the Year – Global Streaming	"Flower"	Won	
Circle Chart Music Awards	2024	Artist of the Year – Digital	"Flower"	Nominated	
Circle Chart Music Awards	2024	Artist of the Year – Streaming Unique Listeners	"Flower"	Nominated	
Circle Chart Music Awards	2024	Mubeat Global Choice Award – Female	Jisoo	Nominated	
D Awards	2025	Best Girl Solo Popularity Award	Jisoo	Nominated	
D Awards	2026	Best Girl Solo Popularity Award	Jisoo	Nominated	
D Awards	2026	Upick Global Choice (Girl)	Jisoo	Nominated	
DDU Awards (Note: Established in 2021, the DDU Awards is an awards ceremony for Korean dramas hosted by a Thai entertainment website, which selects its winners based on public votes and site evaluations.)	2022	Best New Actress	Snowdrop	Won	
The Fact Music Awards	2021	Fan N Star Choice Individual	Jisoo	Nominated	
The Fact Music Awards	2023	Best Music: Spring	"Flower"	Nominated	
The Fact Music Awards	2023	Idolplus Popularity Award	Jisoo	Nominated	
Golden Disc Awards	2024	Best Digital Song (Bonsang)	"Flower"	Won	
Golden Disc Awards	2024	Most Popular Artist (Female)	Jisoo	Won	
Golden Disc Awards	2024	Song of the Year (Daesang)	"Flower"	Nominated	
Hanteo Music Awards	2024	Artist of the Year (Bonsang)	Jisoo	Nominated	
Hanteo Music Awards	2024	Global Artist – Africa	Jisoo	Nominated	
Hanteo Music Awards	2024	Global Artist – Europe	Jisoo	Nominated	
Hanteo Music Awards	2024	Global Artist – North America	Jisoo	Nominated	
Hanteo Music Awards	2024	Global Artist – South America	Jisoo	Nominated	
Hanteo Music Awards	2024	Global Artist – Oceania	Jisoo	Nominated	
Hanteo Music Awards	2026	Best Popular Artist	Jisoo	Nominated	
Hanteo Music Awards	2026	Global Popular Artist – Africa	Jisoo	Nominated	
Hanteo Music Awards	2026	Global Popular Artist – Asia	Jisoo	Nominated	
Hanteo Music Awards	2026	Global Popular Artist – Europe	Jisoo	Nominated	
Hanteo Music Awards	2026	Global Popular Artist – North America	Jisoo	Nominated	
Hanteo Music Awards	2026	Global Popular Artist – South America	Jisoo	Nominated	
Hanteo Music Awards	2026	Global Popular Artist – Oceania	Jisoo	Nominated	
iHeartRadio Music Awards	2024	Best Music Video	"Flower"	Nominated	
iHeartRadio Music Awards	2026	Favorite K-pop Collab	"Eyes Closed" (with Zayn)	Nominated	
K-World Dream Awards	2025	Girl Solo Popularity Award	Jisoo	Nominated	
K-World Dream Awards	2026	Girl Solo Popularity Award	Jisoo	Nominated	
KM Chart Awards (Note: Hosted by KM Chart and KM Chart World and organized by the KMA Organizing Committee and Upick, the KM Chart Awards is an awards ceremony to honor K-pop artists for their contributions to the global music scene over the previous year.)	2026	Best Popular Solo Female Award	Jisoo	Nominated	
KM Chart Awards	2026	Best Popular Song Award	"Earthquake"	Nominated	
Korea Drama Awards	2025	Multi-entertainer Award	Jisoo	Nominated	
Korea First Brand Awards (Note: Hosted by the Korea Consumer Brand Committee and the Korea Consumer Forum, the Korea First Brand Awards bases its winners on a nationwide South Korean survey.)	2026	Best Female Solo Singer (Vietnam)	Jisoo	Won	
Korea Grand Music Awards	2024	Trend of the Year – K-pop Solo	Jisoo	Nominated	
Korea Grand Music Awards	2025	Best Music Video	"Earthquake"	Nominated	
Korea Grand Music Awards	2025	Fan Favorite Artist (Female)	Jisoo	Nominated	
Korea Grand Music Awards	2025	Trend of the Year – K-pop Solo	Jisoo	Nominated	
MAMA Awards	2023	Best Dance Performance Female Solo	"Flower"	Won	
MAMA Awards	2023	Best Female Artist	Jisoo	Won	
MAMA Awards	2023	Best Music Video	"Flower"	Won	
MAMA Awards	2023	Artist of the Year	Jisoo	Nominated	
MAMA Awards	2023	Song of the Year	"Flower"	Nominated	
MAMA Awards	2023	Worldwide Fans' Choice Top 10	Jisoo	Nominated	
MAMA Awards	2025	Artist of the Year	Jisoo	Nominated	
MAMA Awards	2025	Best Dance Performance Female Solo	"Earthquake"	Nominated	
MAMA Awards	2025	Best Female Artist	Jisoo	Nominated	
MAMA Awards	2025	Song of the Year	"Earthquake"	Nominated	
Melon Music Awards	2023	Best Female Solo	Jisoo	Nominated	
Melon Music Awards	2023	Song of the Year	"Flower"	Nominated	
Melon Music Awards	2023	Top 10 Artists	Jisoo	Nominated	
Melon Music Awards	2025	Best Female Solo	Jisoo	Nominated	
MTV Video Music Awards	2025	Best K-Pop	"Earthquake"	Nominated	
MTV Video Music Awards	2026	Best Visual Effects	"Eyes Closed" (with Zayn)	Nominated	
Music Awards Japan	2026	Best of Listeners' Choice: International Song	"Eyes Closed" (with Zayn)	Nominated	
SEC Awards (Note: The SEC Awards, formerly known as the Séries em Cena Awards, is a Brazilian award show that honors achievements in music, film, television, and internet culture in Brazil and globally.)	2026	Performance in an Asian Series	Boyfriend on Demand	Won	
SEC Awards	2026	Asian Artist of the Year	Jisoo	Nominated	
SEC Awards	2026	International Feat of the Year	"Eyes Closed" (with Zayn)	Nominated	
Seoul International Drama Awards	2022	Outstanding Korean Actress	Snowdrop	Won	
Seoul International Drama Awards	2025	Outstanding Asian Star (South Korea)	Newtopia	Won	
Seoul International Drama Awards	2026	Outstanding Asian Star (South Korea)	Boyfriend on Demand	Won	
Seoul Music Awards	2024	Main Award (Bonsang)	Me	Nominated	
Seoul Music Awards	2024	Korean Wave Award	Me	Nominated	
Seoul Music Awards	2024	Popularity Award	Me	Nominated	
Seoul Music Awards	2025	Main Prize (Bonsang)	Jisoo	Nominated	
Seoul Music Awards	2025	K-pop World Choice – Solo	Jisoo	Nominated	
Seoul Music Awards	2025	K-Wave Special Award	Jisoo	Nominated	
Seoul Music Awards	2025	Popularity Award	Jisoo	Nominated	
Seoul Music Awards	2026	New Icon Award	Jisoo	Nominated	
Seoul Music Awards	2026	K-pop World Choice – Solo	Jisoo	Nominated	
Seoul Music Awards	2026	Korea Wave Award	Jisoo	Nominated	
UK Music Video Awards	2025	Best Production Design in a Video	"Earthquake"	Nominated	
UK Music Video Awards	2025	Best Visual Effects in a Video	"Earthquake"	Nominated	
Weibo Starlight Awards	2021	Starlight Hall of Fame (Korea)	Jisoo	Won	

== Other accolades ==
=== State and cultural honors ===
Name of country, year given, and name of honor
Country	Year	Honor	Ref.
South Korea (Note: Awarded at the Korean Popular Culture and Arts Awards, organised by the Korea Creative Content Agency and hosted by the South Korean Ministry of Culture, Sports and Tourism. Honors are given to individuals or groups for their contribution to popular culture in South Korea and abroad.)	2026	Okgwan Order of Cultural Merit (4th Class)	
United Kingdom	2023	Most Excellent Order of the British Empire (MBE)	

=== Listicles ===
Name of publisher, year listed, name of listicle, and placement
Publisher	Year	Listicle	Placement	Ref.
Asia-Pacific Entrepreneurs Association	2025	Asia-Pacific U30 Outstanding Young Leaders	Placed	
Billboard Korea	2024	K-Pop Artist 100	67th	
Complex	2026	The Best Dressed Female K-Pop Stars of All Time, Ranked	12th	
Forbes Korea	2025	Power Celebrity 40	11th	
Forbes Korea	2025	K-Idol of the Year 30	27th	
Forbes Korea	2026	Power Celebrity 40	24th	

== See also ==
- List of awards and nominations received by Blackpink
