= 20th Seoul International Drama Awards =

2025 South Korean awards ceremony

- Sponsored by: Idolchamp; Mugen
- Date: October 2, 2025
- Location: KBS Hall, Yeouido, Seoul
- Country: South Korea
- Presented by: Seoul Drama Awards Organizing Committee; Korean Broadcasters Association
- Most nominations: Adolescence

Television/radio coverage
- Network: KBS

The 20th Annual Seoul International Drama Awards (Korean: 제20회 서울 드라마 어워즈) festival was held on October 2, 2025 at KBS Hall, Yeouido, Seoul. The host is the Seoul Drama Awards Organizing Committee (Korean Broadcasters Association), and the event is supported by the Ministry of Culture, Sports and Tourism, the Seoul Metropolitan Government, KBS, MBC, SBS, EBS, and CBS. The sponsor is IDOLCHAMP and MUGEN. 101 entries from 50 countries vied for awards in this edition. Hosted by Ok Taec-yeon and Jang Do-yeon.

== Event ==
Events
Event	Venue	Dates	MC	Notes
Drama Festa	Banpo Hangang Park and Seokchon Lake West (Songpa Naru Park)	October 3–4, 2022		
Red Carpet	KBS Hall, Yeouido	October 2, 2025	MC Bae and Jang Sun-young	
Award Ceremony	KBS Hall, Yeouido	October 2, 2025	Ok Taec-yeon and Jang Do-yeon	
After party		October 2, 2025	MC Bae and Jang Sun-young	

== Jury ==
=== Preliminaries ===
- Luciana Monteiro (Executive Producer of Drama, TV GLOBO)
- Nicholas Lafferty (Agent at Creative Artists Agency)
- Şenay Filiztekin Turan (Head of Acquisitions, GLOBAL AGENCY)
- Yang Lei (Director)
- Daesic Bae (Secretary-General, Korea Drama Production Association)
- Doobo Shim (Professor of Media Communication, Sungshin Women's University)
- Jaehun Jang (DRAMASTUDIO 1 Executive Producer, MBC)
- Sungsoon Park (Professor of Media & Contents, Pai Chai University)
- Sukyung Oh (Drama Critic, Regular columnist for SisaIN, Kyunghyang Shinmun, Hankyoreh21 and Cine21)
- Sinil Kim (1st Chief Producer, TV drama production center)
- Innam Bach (Director of Division, Broadcasting & Video Content)
- Youngsoo Park (Head of Drama Production, Studio S)

=== Final ===
- Bettina Brinkmann
- Cynthia Fenneman
- Kentaro Yamato
- Chan-il Jeon
- Sangseok Nam
- Sukjin Yun
- Junghwan Han

== Winners and nominees ==
The nominations for the 20th Annual Seoul International Drama Awards were announced on August 20, 2025. Winners are listed first and denoted in bold.

=== International Invitation ===
 NOTE:
- "Golden Bird Prize" recipients are indicated with a double dagger (‡)
- "Silver Bird Prize" recipients are indicated with a dagger (†)

Program
**Golden Bird Prize**
- **Ben Stiller ‡**
  Severance (Apple TV, U.S.)

=== International Competition ===
==== Program ====
Program
**Grand Prize (Daesang)**: **Adolescence** (Netflix, U.K.)
**Best TV Movie**: **The Son** (CJ ENM, South Korea); Our Beautiful Summer (CJ ENM, South Korea); Unbalanced Love (CJ ENM, South Korea); Smetana (Czech Television, Czech); Champagne – Peppino di Capri (RAI Radiotelevisione Italiana, Italy)	**Best Mini-Series**: **Pachinko** (Apple TV, U.S.); Adolescence (Netflix, U.K.); Sunny (Apple TV, U.S.); One Hundred Years of Solitude (Netflix, Colombia); Asura (Netflix, Japan); Light of My Lion (TBS, Japan); The Eternaut (Netflix, Argentina); Hyper Knife (Disney+, South Korea)	**Best Series**: **The Good & The Bad** (AY Yapim, Turkey); D.I.D. 12 (Hong Kong Television Broadcasts Limited); Emerald Hill - The Little Nyonya Story (Mediacorp Pte Ltd, Singapore); For Eagle Brothers (KBS, South Korea); Saving Grace (ABS-CBN Studios, Philippines); She's The One (Globo, Brazil); The Beach S2 (ERT S.A. Hellenic Broadcasting Corporation, Greece); The Nightfall (ATV, Turkiye)

==== Individual ====
Owen Cooper

Individual
**Best Actor**: **Owen Cooper** (Adolescence - United Kingdom); Adam Scott (Severance - U.S.); Giorgos Ninios (The Beach Season 2 -Greece); Han Chin (Forget You Not - Taiwan); Samuel Le Bihan (Alone at Sea - France); Benjamin Voisin (Carême - France)	**Best Actress**: **Cate Blanchett** (Disclaimer - U.S.); **Kim Min-ha** (Pachinko - U.S.); Duda Santhos (She is the One - Brazil; Hsieh Ying-xuan (Forget You Not - Taiwan); Kim Da-mi (Nine Puzzles - South Korea); Kim Jung-young (My Trouble-Maker Mom - South Korea); Rie Miyazawa (Asura - Japan)
**Best Director**: **Hirokazu Kore-eda** (Asura - Japan); **Philip Barantini** (Adolescence - United Kingdom); Bille August (The Count of Montecristo - United Kingdom); Kim Won-seok (When Life Gives You Tangerines - South Korea); Lee Jin-ah To My Lonely Sister (KBS, South Korea); Alex Garcia et al. One Hundred Years of Solitude (Netflix, Colombia); Ben Stiller et al. Severance (Apple TV+, U.S.A); Bille August The Count of Montecristo (RAI Radiotelevisione Italiana, Italy); Leanne Welham et al. Pachinko Season 2 (Apple TV+, U.S.A); Lucy Tcherniak Sunny (Apple TV+, U.S.A); Yiannis Vasileiadis Grand Hotel (JK PRODUCTIONS SAnKARAGIANNIS, Greece)	**Best Writer**: **Dan Erickson** Severance (Apple TV+, U.S.A); Soo Hugh Pachinko Season 2 (Apple TV+, U.S.A); Lim Sang-choon When Life Gives You Tangerines - (Netflix, South Korea); Stephen Graham et al. Adolescence (Netflix, United Kingdom); Danica Domingo et al. Saving Grace (ABS-CBN Studios, Philippines); Emmanuel Carrere Beyond the Grave, a New Adamsberg's Case (France TV Distribution, France); Jan Schomburg et al. Other People's Money (Beta Film, Germany); José Rivera et al. One Hundred Years of Solitude (Netflix, Colombia); Katie Robbins Sunny (Apple TV+, U.S.A)

=== International Invitation: Outstanding Asian Stars ===
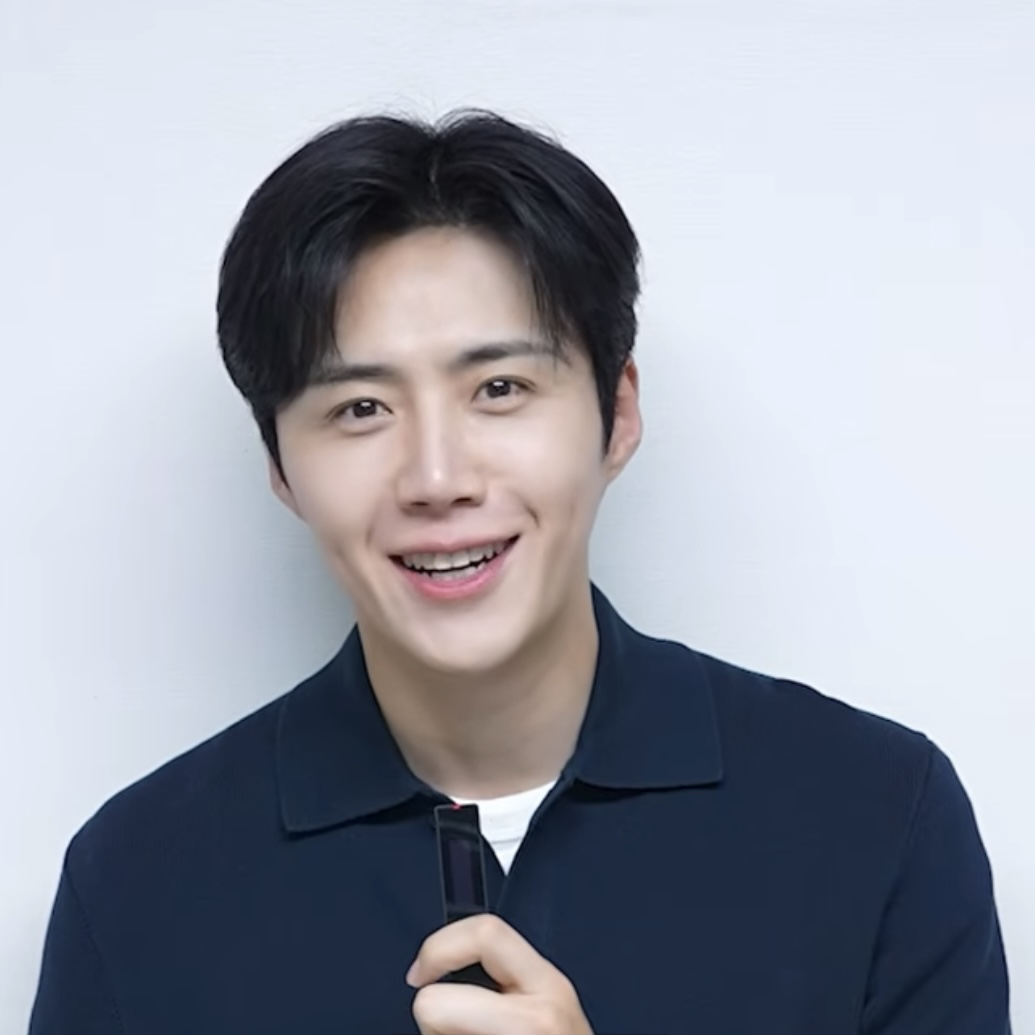
Kim Seon-ho

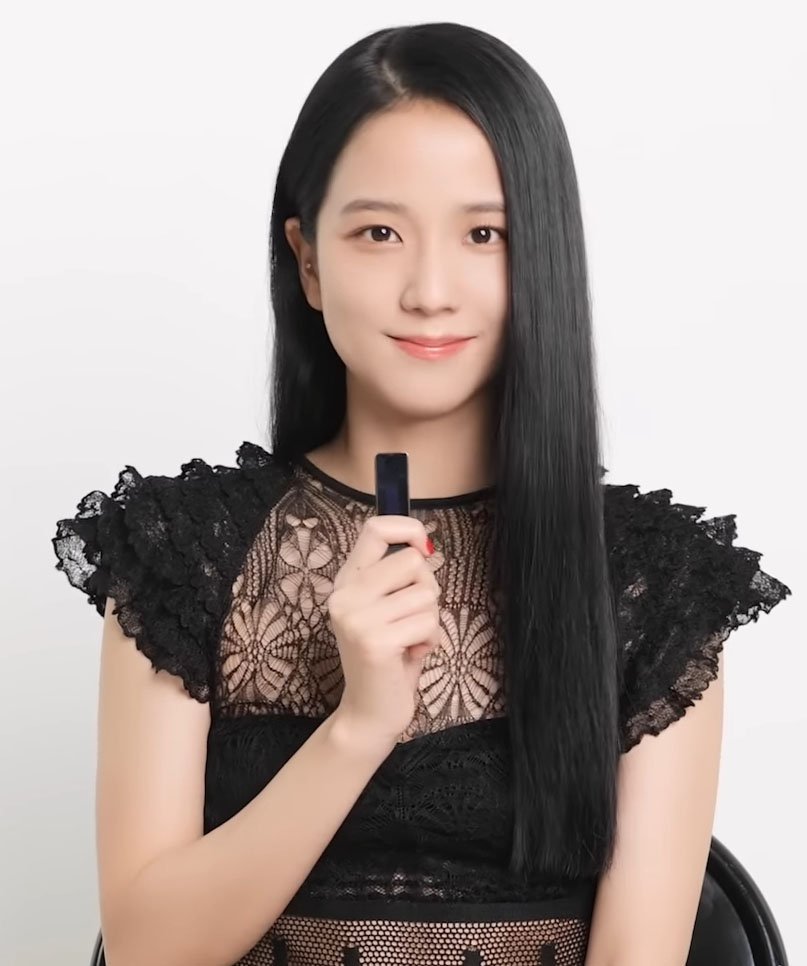
Jisoo

Outstanding Asian Star
**South Korea (Actor)**: **Kim Seon-ho** (The Tyrant - The Walt Disney Company Korea, South Korea)	**South Korea (Actress)**: **Jisoo** (Newtopia - Coupang Play, South Korea)
**Japan**: **Kentaro Sakaguchi** (Beyond Goodbye - Netflix, Japan)	**China**: **Yu Bai** (Bank on Me - China Huace Film&TV Co., Ltd, China)
**Philippines**: **Daniel Padilla** (Incognito - ABS-CBN Studios, Philippines)	**Thailand**: **Film Rachanun Mahawan** (Pluto - GMMTV Co., Ltd., Thailand)
**Malaysia**: **Anna Jobling** (Dear Love - Sistem Televisyen Malaysia Berhad (TV3), Malaysia)

=== K-Drama Competition Category ===
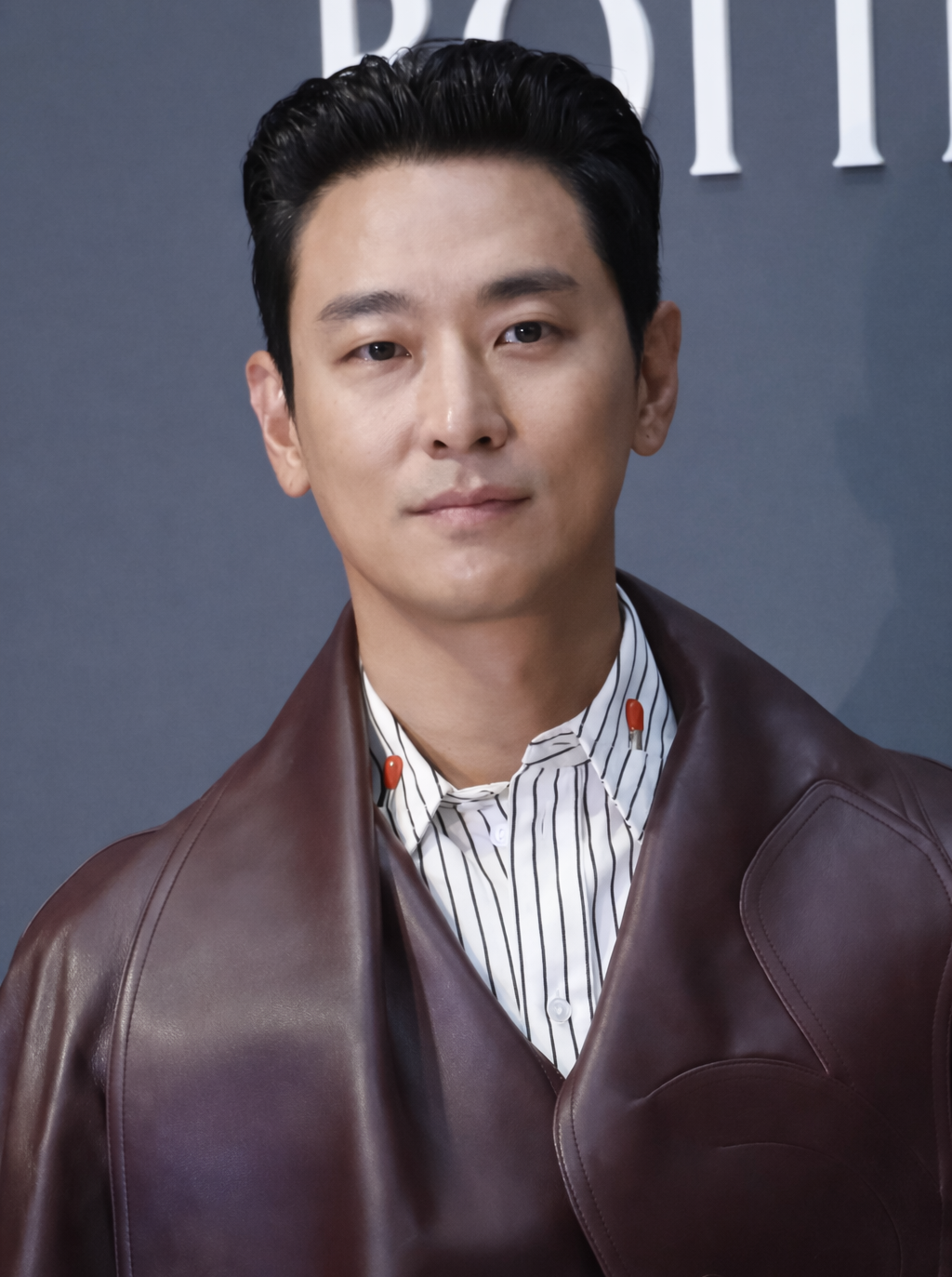
Ju Ji-hoon

K-Drama Competition Category
**Outstanding Korean Drama**: The Trauma Code: Heroes on Call; When Life Gives You Tangerines
**Outstanding Korean Actor**: Ju Ji-hoon The Trauma Code: Heroes on Call (Netflix, South Korea)	**Outstanding Korean Actress**: IU When Life Gives You Tangerines (Netflix, South Korea)
**Outstanding Korean Drama O.S.T**: Young Tak – "Unpredictable Life" (For Eagle Brothers (KBS, South Korea)
