= Your Love (Jisoo song) =

2025 song by Jisoo

- Promotional graphic

Song by Jisoo

from the EP Amortage
- Released: February 14, 2025
- Studio: BK (Seoul); Wavy Baby West (Los Angeles)
- Genre: Electropop; pop-rock; bubblegum pop
- Length: 2:53
- Label: Blissoo; Warner
- Songwriters: Jisoo; Jack Brady; Jordan Roman; Violet Skies; Lilian Caputo; Jenna Raine
- Producers: Blissoo; The Wavys

Music video
- "Your Love" on YouTube

"Your Love" is a song recorded by South Korean singer Jisoo. It is the second track on her debut extended play, Amortage (2025), which was released on February 14, 2025, through Blissoo and Warner Records. Blending elements of electropop, pop-rock, and bubblegum pop, the song captures a woman's deep and immersive happiness in romantic love. The track was written by Jisoo, Violet Skies, Lilian Caputo, Jenna Raine and the Wavys, while production was handled by the latter with Blissoo.

"Your Love" peaked at number 197 on the Circle Digital Chart in South Korea, and has charted in Singapore and New Zealand. Critics responded favorably to its lyrics and production, noting how they showcased a different side of Jisoo and complemented the themes of the album's title track, "Earthquake". A music video for the song was directed by Choann Studio and released on August 12. The video was filmed in Rainforest Wild Asia in partnership with the Singapore Tourism Board.

== Background and release ==
Jisoo announced her departure from YG Entertainment for solo activities in December 2023 and established her own label named Blissoo in February 2024. On January 26, 2025, she revealed that she would be releasing her debut extended play Amortage on Valentine's Day. She announced on January 28 that she had signed a global label deal with Warner Records for her solo music. On February 4, Jisoo unveiled the tracklist and credits for the EP, including the track "Your Love". The following day, she released a concept poster for the track, which provided a hint with the phrase: "Stars in my eyes, constellations for you." "Your Love" was released worldwide alongside the rest of the EP on February 14.

== Lyrics and production ==
"Your Love" has been described as an "effervescent declaration of the pure exhilaration of love" featuring "pulsing synths meant for getting lost on the dance floor". While Jisoo considered performing the song in Korean, she felt the English lyrics were "well-crafted to capture the mood" and ultimately recorded the track in English. She "thoroughly analyze[d] the hidden meanings" to ensure that the lyrics' essence was "well conveyed during the recording".

== Critical reception ==
Crystal Bell of NME described "Your Love" as a "propulsive pop ballad" and praised Jisoo for "stretching her range and vulnerability", delivering the emotional beats entirely in English. Billboard's Jeff Benjamin ranked it the third-best track on Amortage, highlighting its "classic, singalong-style chorus" for amplifying the song's euphoric energy. Benjamin further praised the lyrics' emotional depth and Jisoo's contribution to the English songwriting. The New York Times called the song "the most effective" track on Amortage, likening it to Katy Perry's earlier work and praising its blend of "sweetness with ambition and gloss" as a nod to a "simpler, and perhaps more sustainable, kind of hugeness." In its review, Screen Rant singled out "Your Love" as the standout track of the EP, applauding Jisoo's husky voice and noting that the English lyrics pair beautifully with her vocal tone in what they described as "a sickeningly sweet love song".

== Music video ==
On March 14, 2025, Jisoo released a partial lyric video for the song as part of a special "White Day With Jisoo" segment for Dazed Korea in celebration of White Day. Dedicated to her fans, the video showcased dreamy, casual footage of Jisoo in a cozy home setting and concluded with the message, "I hope I get to see you every day when I open my eyes."

An accompanying music video for "Your Love" was directed by Choann Studio and released on August 12 on Jisoo's YouTube channel. In partnership with the Singapore Tourism Board, the special video was filmed in the wildlife park Rainforest Wild Asia, part of the Mandai Wildlife Reserve in Singapore. It shows the singer in various locations of the park, standing amid trees and inside a cave while wearing a flowing pink gown. Wandering across nature landscapes, she sings as rose petals rain down on her. The video cuts between contemplative shots of Jisoo to shots of tranquil creeks and various flora and fauna, including orchids which are symbolic to Singapore and aerial views of birds flying over the rainforest.

== Live performances ==
Jisoo performed the song on Lights, Love, Action!, a fanmeet tour spanning seven cities across Asia. "Your Love" was later included in Blackpink's Deadline World Tour setlist as a part of Jisoo's solo set.

== Credits and personnel ==
Credits adapted from the liner notes of Amortage.

Recording

- Recorded at BK Studio (Seoul, South Korea) and Wavy Baby West Studio (Los Angeles, California)
- Mixed at Larrabee Studios (North Hollywood, California)
- Mastered at Sterling Sound (Edgewater, New Jersey)

Personnel

- Jisoo – vocals, songwriter
- The Wavys – producer
  - Jack Brady – songwriter, background vocals, recording engineer
  - Jordan Roman – songwriter, background vocals
- Violet Skies – songwriter, background vocals
- Lilian Caputo – songwriter, background vocals
- Jenna Raine – songwriter, background vocals
- Blissoo – producer
- Manny Marroquin – mix engineer
- Zach Pereyra – assistant mix engineer
- Anthony Vilchis – assistant mix engineer
- Trey Station – assistant mix engineer
- Chris Gehringer – mastering engineer

== Charts ==
Chart performance for "Your Love"
Chart (2025)	Peak position
China (TME Korean)	3
New Zealand Hot Singles (RMNZ)	23
Panama Anglo Airplay (Monitor Latino)	15
Singapore Regional (RIAS)	12
South Korea (Circle)	197
