= Sunshower (disambiguation) =

A sunshower is a weather phenomenon.

Sunshower may also refer to:

- Sunshower (Larry Willis album), 2001
- Sunshower (Taeko Ohnuki album), 1977
- Sunshower (Thelma Houston album), 1969
- "Sun Showers", a 2026 single by Jisoo
- "Sunshowers", a 2004 single by M.I.A.
- "Sunshower", a 1976 song by Dr. Buzzard's Original Savannah Band from the album Dr. Buzzard's Original Savannah Band
- "Sunshower", a song by Chris Cornell as part of the soundtrack for Great Expectations (1998 film)
- Sun Shower, a character from My Little Pony
