= Click (Jisoo song) =

2026 single by Jisoo

- Digital cover

Single by Jisoo
- Released: September 4, 2026
- Genre: Dance-pop
- Length: 2:38
- Label: Blissoo; Warner
- Songwriters: Jisoo; Nolan Lambroza; Simon Says; Caroline Ailin; Simon Wilcox
- Producers: Sir Nolan; Simon Says

Jisoo singles chronology
"Eyes Closed" (2025)	"Click" (2026)	"Addicted" (2026)

Music video
- "Click" on YouTube

"Click" is a song by South Korean singer Jisoo. It was released through Blissoo and Warner Records on September 4, 2026, as the lead single from her upcoming debut solo studio album. It was written by Jisoo with Sir Nolan, Simon Says, Caroline Ailin, and Simon Wilcox, with the former two handling the production.

== Background and release ==
On August 24, 2026, Jisoo unveiled a teaser poster of a heart on a pink background, along with the title "Click" and her name. A countdown page was simultaneously launched for September 4, with imagery of an amusement park featuring dolls and a carousel. The same day, Jisoo released a teaser video to her Instagram, which opened with her hand lifting an amusement park ticket. The video featured a dark carnival setting with animatronics appearing to twitch and glitch, while on-screen text confirmed the single's name and release date of September 4. She released a teaser image and cover image for the single on August 28 and 31, showing her holding a teddy bear robot against a backdrop of mechanical objects. "Click" serves as the lead single from Jisoo's upcoming debut studio album.

== Composition and lyrics ==
"Click" is a dance-pop song centered on synth sounds and bass, with simple instrumentation emphasizing the rhythm and Jisoo's mid-range vocals. Lyrically, it expresses the attraction of two people who naturally fit together, despite knowing they shouldn't be drawn to each other, using the word 'click'.

== Accolades ==
Music program awards
Program	Date	Ref.
M Countdown	September 17, 2026	

== Music video ==
The music video for "Click" was directed by Joseph Kahn and filmed in a northeastern district of Bangkok, Thailand. In the clip, Jisoo portrays the last sentient cyborg in a deserted old theme park. She activates several robots, including Chuck E. Cheese-like characters and a fashionably dressed humanoid suitor that courts her. At the heart of the video is the Click Bear, which represents Jisoo's fans from various countries who speak different languages and live different lives.

== Track listing ==
- Digital download and streaming
1. "Click" – 2:38
- CD, NFC, and vinyl
1. "Click" – 2:38
2. "Click" (instrumental) – 2:38

== Credits and personnel ==
Credits adapted from the liner notes of the CD single.

Recording

- Mixed at Unavolta Studios (New York City)
- Mastered at Sterling Sound (Edgewater, New Jersey)

Personnel

- Jisoo – vocals, songwriter, background vocals
- Sir Nolan – songwriter, producer
- Simon Says – songwriter, producer, vocal producer
- Caroline Ailin – songwriter, background vocals
- Simon Wilcox – songwriter
- Elise Yuka – strings, strings arranger
- Leonard Chong – strings
- Stephanie Yu – strings
- The Wavys – vocal recording engineer
- Mischke Butler – additional vocal production, additional vocal recording engineer
- Tony Maserati – mix engineer
- Gabriella Wayne – assistant mix engineer
- Chris Gehringer – mastering engineer
- Will Quinnell – assistant mastering engineer

== Charts ==
=== Weekly charts ===
Weekly chart performance
Chart (2026)	Peak position
China (TME Korean)	3
Global Excl. US (Billboard)	96
Japan Hot 100 (Billboard)	39
New Zealand Hot Singles (RMNZ)	11
Portugal Airplay (AFP)	50
Singapore Regional (RIAS)	10
South Korea (Circle)	93
South Korean Albums (Circle)	3
South Korean Albums (Circle) Blissoo version	15
Taiwan (Billboard)	14
UK Singles Downloads (Official Charts)	29
UK Singles Sales (Official Charts)	35
US Hot Dance/Pop Songs (Billboard)	15
Vietnam Hot 100 (Billboard)	93

=== Monthly charts ===
Monthly chart performance
Chart (2026)	Peak position
South Korea (Circle)	151
South Korean Albums (Circle)	20
South Korean Albums (Circle) Blissoo version	37

== Release history ==
Release dates and formats
Region	Date	Format	Version	Label	Ref.
Various	September 4, 2026	Digital download; streaming	Original	Blissoo; Warner	
Italy	September 4, 2026	Radio airplay	Original	Warner	
South Korea	September 4, 2026	CD; NFC	Original; instrumental	Blissoo	
Various	October 30, 2026	CD; NFC	Original; instrumental	Blissoo; Warner	
South Korea	November 30, 2026	7-inch vinyl	Original; instrumental	Blissoo	

== See also ==
- List of K-pop songs on the Billboard charts
- List of M Countdown Chart winners (2026)
