= Addicted (Jisoo song) =

2026 single by Jisoo

Single by Jisoo
- Released: October 30, 2026
- Genre: Dance-pop
- Length: 2:59
- Label: Blissoo; Warner
- Composers: Jack Brady; Jordan Roman; Sol Was; Terius Gesteelde-Diamant
- Lyricists: Jisoo; Austin Wolfe; Tiina Vainikainen
- Producers: The Wavys; Sol Was

Jisoo singles chronology
"Click" (2026)	"Addicted" (2026)	"Sun Showers" (2026)

Music video
- "Addicted" on YouTube

"Addicted" is a song by South Korean singer Jisoo. It was released through Blissoo and Warner Records on October 30, 2026, as the second single from her upcoming debut solo studio album. It was written by Jisoo with Austin Wolfe, Terius Gesteelde-Diamant, Tiina Vainikainen, the Wavys and Sol Was, with the latter two handling the production.

== Background and release ==
On September 4, 2026, Jisoo released "Click" as the lead single from her upcoming debut studio album. On October 24, her agency Blissoo revealed her follow-up single "Addicted" and its release date of October 30. The announcement was accompanied by an animation of the song's logo, featuring the title over a backdrop of heart-shaped lightning striking across a dark purple night sky. The following day, she unveiled a teaser poster of herself standing behind a sparkling curtain with full bangs and matching black nails. On the 26th, Jisoo uploaded a teaser image showing her standing in a star-patterned outfit alongside release times for major cities around the world. A video preview was also released that offered fans a snippet of the song's melody and choreography.

On the 27th, Jisoo uploaded a teaser with the single's cover art, feauring herself crouching in front of a sparkling background, wearing a star-patterned mini dress and high platform heels. The music video teaser for "Addicted" was released on October 28 and depicted Jisoo swimming through water under a thunderous sky and flashing lights. The following day, she unveiled a teaser poster showcasing her sparkling decorative outfit with feather details against a dark and dreamy background. The day of the single's release, she posted another teaser image of herself wearing a lace-decorated outfit with a purple color scheme. "Addicted" was released on October 30 as the second single from Jisoo's upcoming debut studio album.

== Composition and lyrics ==
"Addicted" is a dance-pop song anchored by driving electronic rhythms that embraces a darker and more moody sound. Lyrically, the song captures the sweet yet intoxicating emotions of love. Jisoo expresses the feeling of being constantly drawn in and falling deeply before one realizes it. The lightning sound effect in the introduction, the intense beat, and Jisoo's wide vocal range all combine to enhance the song's appeal. She also showcases a different side from her previous work with a cool and restrained-toned rap in the latter part of the song.

== Music video ==
An accompanying music video for "Addicted" was released alongside the single on Jisoo's YouTube channel. The video displays the singer in various modern outfits and wigs against simple yet luxurious backgrounds, including a silver, sequined curtain and a neon, kaleidoscope-inspired LED screen. At the beginning, Jisoo wears a black bob and a red bodycon-style dress, which she confirmed was a reference to Resident Evil's Ada Wong.

== Live performances ==
On November 7, 2026, Jisoo performed "Addicted" live for the first time on the South Korean music program Show! Music Core, broadcast by MBC. She performed the song on November 8 on SBS's Inkigayo, where she sparked a viral meme in South Korea when she encouraged the audience to cheer by saying "louder". On November 13, Jisoo performed "Addicted" on KBS's Music Bank, her first appearance on the show since her debut in 2016.

== Credits and personnel ==
Credits adapted from Tidal.

- Jisoo – lead vocals, background vocals, lyricist
- The Wavys – producer
  - Jack Brady – composer, bass, drums, percussion, synthesizer, recording engineer
  - Jordan Roman – composer, bass, drums, percussion, synthesizer
- Sol Was – composer, producer, bass, bass guitar, drums, percussion, synthesizer
- Terius Gesteelde-Diamant – composer, bass, drums, percussion, synthesizer
- Austin Wolfe – lyricist
- Tiina Vainikainen – background vocals, lyricist
- Estrella Castillo – background vocals
- Kuk Harrell – recording engineer, vocal engineer, vocal producer
- Fermin Suero Jr. – vocal engineer
- Tony Maserati – mix engineer
- Gabriella Wayne – assistant mix engineer
- Chris Gehringer – mastering engineer
- Will Quinnell – assistant mastering engineer

== Charts ==
Chart performance
Chart (2026)	Peak position
Chile Airplay (Monitor Latino)	14
China (TME Korean)	4
Global K-Songs (Billboard Korea)	35
New Zealand Hot Singles (RMNZ)	20
Singapore Regional (RIAS)	15
South Korea (Circle)	197
Taiwan (Billboard)	23
UK Singles Sales (Official Charts)	19
Vietnam Hot 100 (Billboard)	96

== Release history ==
Release dates and formats
Region	Date	Format	Label	Ref.
Various	October 30, 2026	Digital download; streaming	Blissoo; Warner	
Italy	October 30, 2026	Radio airplay	Warner	
