= Eyes Closed (Jisoo and Zayn song) =

2025 single by Jisoo and Zayn

Single by Jisoo and Zayn
- Released: October 10, 2025
- Genre: Synth-pop
- Length: 3:01
- Label: Blissoo; Warner
- Songwriters: Jisoo; Zayn Malik; Alex Hope; Amanda "Kiddo" Ibanez; Isaiah Tejada; Jordan K. Johnson; Mikky Ekko; Nick Long; Stefan Johnson
- Producers: The Monsters & Strangerz; Isaiah Tejada; Alex Hope

Jisoo singles chronology
"Earthquake" (2025)	"Eyes Closed" (2025)	"Click" (2026)

Zayn singles chronology
"Stardust" (2024)	"Eyes Closed" (2025)	"Die for Me" (2026)

Music video
- "Eyes Closed" on YouTube

"Eyes Closed" is a song by South Korean singer Jisoo and English singer Zayn. It was released as a single through Blissoo and Warner Records on October 10, 2025. A synth-pop track about entering into a new relationship after past heartbreak, it was written by Jisoo and Zayn with Amanda "Kiddo" Ibanez, Mikky Ekko, Nick Long, and its producers The Monsters & Strangerz, Isaiah Tejada, and Alex Hope.

"Eyes Closed" became Jisoo's second top-ten hit and Zayn's first on the Billboard Global Excl. US, while it peaked at number 20 on the Billboard Global 200. It was Jisoo's first entry on the US Billboard Hot 100 at number 72, making Blackpink the first girl group in history to have all its members enter the chart as soloists. An accompanying music video was directed by Frank Borin and Ivanna Borin and released alongside the single on the artists' YouTube channels. The futuristic video depicts Jisoo and Zayn finding each other as the only two awakened passengers in a spaceship on its way towards Saturn.

== Background and release ==
On July 27, 2025, Zayn shared an Instagram Story of him and his 4-year old daughter Khai attending Blackpink's Deadline World Tour in New York City and said that they "loved it". He later alluded to new music coming out "soon with another cool collaborator" on a live stream. On October 5, Blackpink member Jisoo shared a poster for an upcoming single named "Eyes Closed". Captioned "a duet is near", the poster showed her in a black leather dress with a mystery silhouette in the background. According to The Korea Herald, an industry source revealed the single to be a new ballad duet with Zayn set to be released some time during the month and hinted that was the reason the singer was invited to Blackpink's concert. The next day, Jisoo shared a second teaser poster with the caption "Two voices, one orbit. Coming soon," depicting herself in the foreground while a male figure stands with his back turned. Fans noticed that the tattoo on the back of the mystery singer's head looked similar to Zayn's. On October 8, the duo officially announced the digital single, two days ahead of its release on October 10. It marked Jisoo's first official English-language single, and her first solo release since her extended play Amortage (2025).

== Composition and lyrics ==
"Eyes Closed" has been described as a "soulful and tender" pop song with a "dreamy" melody that highlights Jisoo and Zayn's vocals. The production blends warm keys, acoustic guitar, bass synth and atmospheric elements. The duo sing about diving into a new relationship where both carry wounds from their respective pasts. They express hesitation at first but ultimately decide to pursue their romance despite their past experiences. Jisoo starts the ballad by singing, "Time is standing still and I don’t want to leave your lips / Tracing my body with your fingertips," to which Zayn responds, "I know what you’re feeling and I know you want to say it / I do too, but we gotta be patient." They trade lines about how a love that shouldn’t work is somehow perfect, especially without trying to make sense of it, before joining together to sing the "heart-swelling" chorus: "Oh, we should fall in love with our eyes closed / Better if we keep it where we don’t know / The beds we’ve been in / The names and the faces of who we were with."

== Critical reception ==
Professional ratings
Review scores
Source	Rating
IZM	3.5/5 stars

Writing for IZM, So Seung-geun rated "Eyes Closed" 3.5 out of 5 stars and praised the "transparent, dreamy electronic sound" that concealed the "erotic lyrics", as well as Jisoo and Zayn's "relaxed vocals". He argued that friendly competition between the artists and their bandmates fueled their determination to prove their musical ability, culminating in great results with the song.

== Accolades ==
Awards and nominations for "Eyes Closed"
Year	Organization	Award	Result	Ref.
2025	Asian Pop Music Awards	Best Collaboration	Nominated	
2026	BreakTudo Awards	International Collaboration of the Year	Pending	
2026	iHeartRadio Music Awards	Favorite K-pop Collab	Nominated	
2026	MTV Video Music Awards	Best Visual Effects	Nominated	
2026	Music Awards Japan	Best of Listeners' Choice: International Song	Nominated	

== Commercial performance ==
"Eyes Closed" debuted at number ten on the Billboard Global Excl. US, becoming Jisoo's second top-ten hit after "Flower" (2023) and Zayn's first top-ten hit on the chart. The song earned 43.9 million streams and 5,000 sold outside the US in its first tracking week. In the United States, "Eyes Closed" debuted at number 72 on the Billboard Hot 100 with 5.8 million streams, 225,000 in radio airplay audience and 2,000 sold in its first week. Jisoo earned her first solo entry on the Hot 100, following ten entries with Blackpink. She became the fourth and final member of Blackpink to chart as a soloist, making Blackpink the first all-female group in history to have all its members reach the Hot 100 individually. Blackpink also became the tenth group of four or more members in history to have all members score a solo entry on the chart, joining the Beatles, BTS, Eagles, Fleetwood Mac, New Edition, New Kids on the Block, One Direction, U2, and Wu-Tang Clan. It later debuted at number 38 on the Billboard Pop Airplay chart dated November 8, 2025, earning Jisoo her first entry on the chart and Zayn his eighth. This made Jisoo the fourth and final member of Blackpink to enter the chart as a soloist, following Lisa's five entries and Jennie and Rosé's three each, in addition to the group's three entries. In the United Kingdom, "Eyes Closed" debuted at number 37 and became Jisoo's highest-charting solo entry, one spot above her first entry "Flower".

== Music video ==
A music video for "Eyes Closed" was directed by Frank Borin and Ivanna Borin and released alongside the single on Jisoo and Zayn's YouTube channels. In the video, the two wake from suspended animation on a spaceship as they float in zero gravity. As the only two awakened passengers, they drift through the spaceship alone before finally finding each other mid-orbit and falling in love. They sing the chorus together in an endless hallway as the spaceship zooms towards a landing on Saturn.

== Track listing ==
- Digital download and streaming
1. "Eyes Closed" – 3:01
- Digital download and streaming – 2X
1. "Eyes Closed" (2X) – 2:46
2. "Eyes Closed" (0.5X) – 3:09
3. "Eyes Closed" – 3:01
- Digital download and streaming – bare/unveiled
1. "Eyes Closed" (bare) – 3:00
2. "Eyes Closed" (unveiled) – 3:01
3. "Eyes Closed" – 3:01

== Credits and personnel ==
Credits are adapted from Tidal.

- Jisoo – vocals, songwriter
- Zayn – vocals, songwriter
- Alex Hope – songwriter, producer, guitar
- Amanda "Kiddo" Ibanez – songwriter, vocal arranger
- Isaiah Tejada – songwriter, producer, drums, guitar, keyboards, programming
- Mikky Ekko – songwriter
- Nick Long – songwriter
- The Monsters & Strangerz – producer
  - Jordan K. Johnson – songwriter, drums, guitar, keyboards, programming
  - Stefan Johnson – songwriter, drums, guitar, keyboards, programming
- Nico Aranda – guitar
- Frank "Waterz" Holland – recording engineer
- Mischke Butler – vocal producer, recording engineer
- Joe Grasso – immersive mix engineer
- Serban Ghenea – mix engineer
- Bryce Bordone – assistant mix engineer
- Chris Gehringer – mastering engineer
- Will Quinnell – assistant mastering engineer

== Charts ==
=== Weekly charts ===
Weekly chart performance
Chart (2025–2026)	Peak position
Australia (ARIA)	47
Belgium (Ultratop 50 Flanders)	26
Canada Hot 100 (Billboard)	39
Central America Anglo Airplay (Monitor Latino)	8
China (TME Korean)	2
Costa Rica Anglo Airplay (Monitor Latino)	4
Dominican Republic Anglo Airplay (Monitor Latino)	18
Estonia Airplay (TopHit)	188
Global 200 (Billboard)	20
Guatemala Anglo Airplay (Monitor Latino)	5
Hong Kong (Billboard)	5
India International (IMI)	4
Indonesia (IFPI)	10
Ireland (IRMA)	67
Japan (Japan Hot 100)	37
Lebanon (Lebanese Top 20)	12
Lithuania Airplay (TopHit)	56
Malaysia (IFPI)	3
Mexico Anglo Airplay (Monitor Latino)	15
Middle East and North Africa (IFPI)	15
Netherlands (Dutch Top 40)	28
Netherlands (Single Tip)	4
New Zealand Hot Singles (RMNZ)	1
Paraguay Anglo Airplay (Monitor Latino)	4
Peru Anglo Airplay (Monitor Latino)	17
Philippines Hot 100 (Billboard Philippines)	8
Portugal (AFP)	111
Romania Airplay (TopHit)	62
Saudi Arabia (IFPI)	19
Serbia Airplay (Radiomonitor)	19
Singapore (RIAS)	5
South Korea (Circle)	128
Switzerland (Schweizer Hitparade)	91
Taiwan (Billboard)	4
Thailand (IFPI)	7
United Arab Emirates (IFPI)	6
UK Singles (Official Charts)	37
UK British Asian (OCC)	1
US Billboard Hot 100	72
US Adult Pop Airplay (Billboard)	25
US Pop Airplay (Billboard)	30
Vietnam (IFPI)	8

=== Monthly charts ===
Monthly chart performance
Chart (2026)	Peak position
Romania Airplay (TopHit)	69

== Release history ==
Release dates and formats for "Eyes Closed"
Region	Date	Format	Version	Label	Ref.
Various	October 10, 2025	Digital download; streaming	Original	Blissoo; Warner	
Italy	October 10, 2025	Radio airplay	Original	Warner Italy	
United States	October 21, 2025	Contemporary hit radio	Original	Warner	
Various	October 31, 2025	Digital download; streaming	2X	Blissoo; Warner	
Various	November 14, 2025	Digital download; streaming	Bare/unveiled	Blissoo; Warner	
