= Sun Showers =

2026 single by Jisoo

Single by Jisoo

from the album The Angry Birds Movie 3 (Music from and Inspired by the Motion Picture)
- Released: November 20, 2026
- Genre: Pop
- Length: 2:51
- Label: Blissoo; Warner
- Songwriters: Jisoo; Bailey Flores; Gabe Reali; Jack Brady; Jordan Roman
- Producer: The Wavys

Jisoo singles chronology
"Addicted" (2026)	"Sun Showers" (2026)

Music video
- "Sun Showers" on YouTube

"Sun Showers" is a song by South Korean singer Jisoo. It was released through Blissoo and Warner Records on November 20, 2026, as the lead single from the soundtrack to the animated comedy film The Angry Birds Movie 3 (2026). It was written by Jisoo with Bailey Flores, Gabe Reali, and the Wavys, with production handled by the latter.

== Background and release ==
On November 3, 2026, it was announced that Jisoo will contribute the song "Sun Showers" to the soundtrack of the animated film The Angry Birds Movie 3 (2026). Co-written by Jisoo, the track features in the film, set to be released on December 23, and its trailer. The single's cover art was also revealed, featuring the character "Shumon," a small dustball creature that Jisoo drew in middle school. A snippet of the track was revealed at the 2026 Kids' Choice Awards as well as its release date of November 20.

== Composition and lyrics ==
"Sun Showers" was written by Jisoo with Bailey Flores, Gabe Reali, and the song's producer the Wavys. It is an upbeat, anthemic pop track, with Jisoo stating that she wanted to capture the movie's playful energy through a "fun, feel-good song that makes people want to smile and dance along."

== Music video ==
An accompanying music video for "Sun Showers" was released alongside the single. It features animated characters from the film as well as Shumon, a dustball-inspired character created by Jisoo in middle school.

== Credits and personnel ==
Credits adapted from Tidal.

- Jisoo – vocals, songwriter
- The Wavys – producer
  - Jack Brady – songwriter, programming, recording engineer
  - Jordan Roman – songwriter, programming
- Bailey Flores – songwriter
- Gabe Reali – songwriter
- Tony Maserati – mix engineer
- Gabriella Wayne – assistant mix engineer
- Julia Norelli – assistant mix engineer
- Chris Gehringer – mastering engineer
- Will Quinnell – assistant mastering engineer

== Release history ==
Release dates and formats
Region	Date	Format	Label	Ref.
Various	November 20, 2026	Digital download; streaming	Blissoo; Warner	
