= Boyfriend on Demand =

2026 South Korean television series

- Promotional poster
- Hangul: 월간남친
- Hanja: 月刊男親
- Lit.: Monthly Boyfriend
- RR: Wolgan namchin
- MR: Wŏlgan namch'in
- Genre: Science fantasy; Romantic comedy
- Written by: Namgung Do-young
- Directed by: Kim Jung-sik
- Starring: Jisoo; Seo In-guk
- Music by: Gaemi
- Country of origin: South Korea
- Original language: Korean
- No. of episodes: 10

Production
- Executive producers: Oh Hwan-min; Jang Se-jung; Choi Ho-sung; Park Min-soo
- Production locations: South Korea; Cebu, Philippines
- Cinematography: Park Sung-yong; Park Im-hwan
- Editors: Kim Soo-hyun; Lee Hae-min
- Running time: 50–68 minutes
- Production companies: WhyNot Media; Baram Pictures; Kakao Entertainment

Original release
- Network: Netflix
- Release: March 6, 2026

Boyfriend on Demand (Korean: 월간남친) is a 2026 South Korean science fantasy romantic comedy television series written by Namgung Do-young and directed by Kim Jung-sik. Starring Jisoo and Seo In-guk, it follows a burnt-out webtoon producer whose reality blurs after she subscribes to a virtual dating service. Originally developed for broadcast on MBC, the series was later acquired by Netflix as an original production. It was released on March 6, 2026, and received mixed reviews from critics.

== Synopsis ==
Exhausted by the demands of her career, webtoon producer Seo Mi-rae seeks an escape from the complexities of real-world relationships through a subscription-based virtual reality application. The service allows her to inhabit a digital world where she can interact with a wide array of simulated partners programmed to be her ideal matches. However, the boundaries between her digital romance and her professional reality begin to blur as she becomes increasingly immersed in the simulation.

== Cast and characters ==
=== Main ===
- Jisoo as Seo Mi-rae
- Seo In-guk as Park Kyeong-nam / Gu Yeong-il

=== Supporting ===
- Gong Min-jeung as Yun Song, a webtoon artist who Mi-rae manages
- Kim Ah-young
- Park Hae-rin
- Ha Young as Lee Ji-yeon, Mi-rae's bestfriend
- Yoo Seon-ho as Hwany, a webtoon artist who Kyeong-nam manages
- Han Ga-eul as Song Eun-ju
- Jo Han-chul as Hwang Byung-hak
- Lee Hak-joo as Min Joon-young
- Lee Soo-min as Yoo So-young, Mi-Rae’s friend

=== Special appearances ===
- Kim Sung-cheol as Kim Se-jun, Mi-rae's ex-boyfriend
- Seo Kang-joon as Seo Eun-ho, a kumdo martial artist who appears in the Boyfriend on Demand program
- Lee Soo-hyuk as Choi Si-woo, a webtoon protagonist who appears in the Boyfriend on Demand program
- Lee Hyun-wook as a prosecutor who appears in the Boyfriend on Demand program
- Lee Jae-wook as a senior doctor who appears in the Boyfriend on Demand program
- Lee Sang-yi as a firefighter
- Ong Seong-wu as Bae Hyeon-woo, an agent who appears in the Boyfriend on Demand program
- Kim Young-dae as an ancient Korean assassin who appears in the Boyfriend on Demand program
- Jay Park as himself
- Yoo In-na as the dating manager
- Choi Si-won as J-jong
- Nam Woo-hyun

== Episodes ==
No.	Title	Original release date
1	"The Futures of You and Me"; Transliteration: "Nawa dangsinui mirae" (Korean: 나와 당신의 미래)	March 6, 2026
2	"Cliche or Classic"; Transliteration: "Keullisye hogeun keullaesik" (Korean: 클리셰 혹은 클래식)	March 6, 2026
3	"First Love 101"; Transliteration: "Cheotsarangui ihae" (Korean: 첫사랑의 이해)	March 6, 2026
4	"No Risk, High Return"; Transliteration: "No riseukeu, hai riteon" (Korean: 노 리스크, 하이 리턴)	March 6, 2026
5	"The Caveats of Perfection"; Transliteration: "Wanbyeogiraneun byeok" (Korean: 완벽이라는 벽)	March 6, 2026
6	"The Hybrid Man"; Transliteration: "Haibeurideuhyeong namja" (Korean: 하이브리드형 남자)	March 6, 2026
7	"The Algorithm of Feelings"; Transliteration: "Gamjeongui algorijeum" (Korean: 감정의 알고리즘)	March 6, 2026
8	"The Odd or Even Game"; Transliteration: "Holjjak geim" (Korean: 홀짝 게임)	March 6, 2026
9	"Like or Love"; Transliteration: "Jokeona deo jokeona" (Korean: 좋거나 더 좋거나)	March 6, 2026
10	"An Utterly Normal Future"; Transliteration: "Itorok pyeongbeomhan mirae" (Korean: 이토록 평범한 미래)	March 6, 2026

== Production ==
=== Development and filming ===
The series was developed to be an MBC drama but was later picked up as a Netflix Original. Director Kim Jung-sik, who helmed Work Later, Drink Now series (2021–2023) and No Gain No Love (2024), took the megaphone. The script was written by Namgung Do-young with production collaborated by WhyNot Media, Baram Pictures, and Kakao Entertainment.

Director Kim stated that the series' primary appeal lies in its "anthology-like" romance structure, where Mi-rae, played by Jisoo, interacts with different characters across various simulated worldviews and settings. He emphasized that the production focused on showcasing Jisoo's versatility by assigning her character distinct occupations and varying "acting tones" for each virtual episode to differentiate them from her real-world persona.

In February 2025, both Jisoo and Seo were seen filming in Cebu, Philippines.

=== Casting ===
In August 2024, Jisoo received an offer to star as the female lead for the series. The next month, Seo In-guk was cast to take the male lead role. Netflix confirmed Jisoo and Seo's roles by February 2025.

In 2025, Gong Min-jeung was cast, and this would be her first work after giving birth. Kim Ah-young, Park Hae-rin, Ha Young, and Han Ga-eul were also cast to play various supporting roles. The production features an ensemble of actors portraying the various "virtual boyfriends" within the titular subscription service. The lineup includes Seo Kang-joon, Lee Soo-hyuk, Lee Hyun-wook, Lee Jae-wook, Kim Sung-cheol, Lee Sang-yi, Ong Seong-wu, Kim Young-dae, and Jay Park. While Yoo In-na would be taking on a specialized role as the "dating manager" responsible for matching the protagonist with her ideal scenarios.

=== Music ===
The soundtrack features a contribution from Doyoung of NCT, who recorded his track prior to his mandatory military service in December 2025. The song, which was described as a warm, refreshing ballad, was first previewed during the February 2026 production showcase. The collaboration drew media attention due to the performers' "Jin-Ji-Do" (Note: Combined first syllables of Jinyoung, Jisoo, and Doyoung's names.) bond, established when they served as co-hosts for the music program Inkigayo from 2017 to 2018. Choi Ye-na and Fromis 9 were also confirmed to contribute to the series' soundtrack, delivering an anime-themed track and a refreshing sound, respectively.

== Release and promotion ==
Boyfriend on Demand was reportedly scheduled to be released on Netflix in 2026. In January 2026, Netflix unveiled its 2026 Korean Contents lineup, and the series was included in the first quarter release window of 2026. The next month, it was confirmed for a March 6 premiere with a total of 10 episodes. Netflix released the first teaser poster and a 50-second teaser trailer, both featuring the series' premise: a "subscription-based virtual dating service". These promotional materials depicted the contrast between the protagonist's career as a webtoon producer and the dating scenarios experienced within the simulation.

== Reception ==
=== Critical response ===
Professional ratings
Aggregate scores
Source	Rating
Rotten Tomatoes	71%
Review scores
Source	Rating
South China Morning Post	2.5/5 stars
iMBC	2/3 stars
India Today	3/5 stars

On the review aggregator website Rotten Tomatoes, 71% of 7 critics' reviews are positive, with an average rating of 6.9/10. International reception was largely divided between praise for the show’s conceptual charm and criticism of its narrative depth. Joel Keller of Decider gave the series a "Stream It" recommendation, highlighting the "diverse dating scenarios" and Jisoo's "charm" as elements that distinguished the show from conventional romantic comedies. Similarly, The Economic Times labeled the series a "must-watch," specifically praising the lead chemistry and the "fresh setting" of virtual romance.

Conversely, Pierce Conran of the South China Morning Post rated the series 2.5 out of 5 stars, describing it as "too conventional" with a "loopy and repetitive" narrative that failed to utilize the leads' emotional range. India Today gave a 3 out of 5 rating, noting that while the actors were "watchable," the production was hampered by a predictable plot and uneven execution. Writing for Time, Kaity Burt argued the series took a "safer, less rewarding path" that limited its potential to provide meaningful commentary on digital immersion versus human connection.

Korean critics focused heavily on the technical execution and acting quality. Kim Jong-eun of iMBC gave the series 2 out of 3 stars; he praised the direction and soundtrack but described Jisoo's performance as "stagnant," citing issues with vocal delivery and articulation in emotional scenes. The Fact's Kim Saet-byeol echoed these sentiments, calling Jisoo's portrayal "underwhelming" and noting that Seo In-guk was limited by a "repetitive character archetype". Choi Ha-na of TV Daily criticized the series for prioritizing aesthetics over substance, stating that the focus on close-ups could not compensate for a slow-paced script, though she noted that Seo Kang-joon's cameo in the third episode provided a temporary boost to the narrative. Lee Sun-myung of Sports Kyunghyang noted that sharp criticism regarding the lead performance was reflected by both domestic audiences and international viewers on platforms such as MyDramaList and Reddit.

A multi-review report by Maeil Business Newspaper further illustrated this polarization through four industry evaluations, with ratings ranging from 1.5 to 3 out of 5 stars. Reporters Yang So-young and Han Hyun-jung criticized the lack of romantic chemistry, with Han remarking that "the acting is bad, but the visuals are a perfect fit". While one anonymous broadcast reporter suggested the lead role was not a "tailor-made outfit" for the actress, another industry insider awarded the show 3 stars, attributing much of its appeal to the strength of the supporting performances.

=== Controversy ===
On March 17, Seo Kyoung-duk of Sungshin Women's University publicly denounced the widespread illegal distribution of the series on Chinese piracy websites. Despite the lack of an official release in the region, the drama gained traction on the Chinese review site Douban, where it received numerous user ratings. Seo criticized the unauthorized viewership as a "lack of shame" regarding intellectual property rights and urged Chinese authorities to take responsible measures to prevent the persistent piracy of South Korean cultural content.

=== Viewership ===
Upon release, Boyfriend on Demand debuted at number four on Netflix's Global Top 10 Non-English Shows chart. In its first three days (March 6–8, 2026), the series accumulated 25.6 million hours watched, totaling 2.6 million views and reached the top 10 in 34 countries. The following week, Boyfriend on Demand rose to number one on the Global Top 10 Non-English Shows chart and entered the top 10 in 47 countries worldwide. As of March 15, the series recorded 4.8 million views and 47.8 million viewing hours.

=== Accolades ===
Awards and nominations
Award ceremony	Year	Category	Nominee	Result	Ref.
Asia Star Entertainer Awards	2026	Fan Choice Couple	Seo In-guk and Jisoo	Nominated	
SEC Awards (Note: The SEC Awards, formerly known as the Séries em Cena Awards, is a Brazilian award show that honors achievements in music, film, television, and internet culture in Brazil and globally.)	2026	Best Asian Series	Boyfriend on Demand	Won	
SEC Awards	2026	Performance in an Asian Series	Jisoo	Won	
Seoul International Drama Awards	2026	Outstanding Asian Star (South Korea)	Jisoo	Won	
