= Chin Han =

Chin Han may refer to:

- Chin Han or Jinhan confederacy (辰韓), Korean confederacy from around the 1st century BC to the 4th century AD
- Chin Han (actor, born 1938) (金漢), retired Hong Kong actor originally from mainland China, active in Hong Kong and Taiwanese cinema from 1963 to 1983
- Chin Han (actor, born 1946) (秦漢), Taiwanese actor originally from mainland China, active in Taiwanese, Hong Kong and Chinese cinema from 1970 until present
- Chin Han (actor, born 1969) (黃經漢), Singaporean actor active in Hollywood
