= Newtopia =

2025 South Korean television series

- Promotional poster
- Hangul: 뉴토피아
- RR: Nyutopia
- MR: Nyut'op'ia
- Genre: Romantic fantasy; Zombie comedy
- Based on: Influenza by Han Sang-woon
- Written by: Han Jin-won; Ji Ho-jin
- Directed by: Yoon Sung-hyun
- Starring: Park Jeong-min; Jisoo
- Music by: Primary
- Country of origin: South Korea
- Original language: Korean
- No. of episodes: 8

Production
- Running time: 50–60 minutes
- Production companies: Bound Entertainment; Billions Plus

Original release
- Network: Coupang Play
- Release: February 7 – March 21, 2025

Newtopia (Korean: 뉴토피아) is a 2025 South Korean romantic fantasy zombie comedy television series starring Park Jeong-min and Jisoo. It aired on Coupang Play From February 7, to March 21, 2025, at 20:00 (KST) and is also available for streaming on Amazon Prime Video in selected regions. The series received mixed reviews from critics, who praised its stylish mise-en-scène but criticized the lack of narrative tension, a "lazy" script, and the lead performances' perceived lack of range and realism.

== Synopsis ==
A couple who have recently broken up attempt to reunite following the emergence of a zombie outbreak that overtakes South Korea.

== Cast ==
- Park Jeong-min as Lee Jae-yoon, a soldier
- Jisoo as Kang Young-joo, Jae-yoon's girlfriend
- Im Sung-jae as Ra In-ho, Jae-yoon's successor
- Hong Seo-hee as Oh Soo-jung, a VIP lounge employee
- Tang Jun-sang as Sam-soo, Young-ju's strong supporter
- Lee Hak-joo as Sung Tae-sik / Alex, the CEO of Alex Entertainment
- Kim Junhan as Aaron Park, hotel manager near Jae-yoon's unit
- Kang Young-seok as Seo Jin-wook
- Choi Hee-jin as Choi Seul-gi
- Lee Cho-hee as Park Eun-chae
- Justin John Harvey as Chef Paolo

== Production ==
=== Development ===
Newtopia series was directed by Yoon Sung-hyun, who directed Bleak Night (2010) and Time to Hunt (2020), and the script was co-written by Han Jin-won, who wrote Parasite (2019), and Ji Ho-jin, who wrote A Shop for Killers (2024). It was produced by Bound Entertainment and Billions Plus. It is based on the novel Influenza by author Han Sang-woon. The production of Newtopia was confirmed on August 7, 2024.

=== Casting ===
In 2023, Jisoo, Park Jeong-min, and Kim Jun-han were reportedly considering to appear, respectively. On April 8, 2024, Hong Seo-hee was reportedly confirmed to appear. On August 1, Coupang Play confirmed the casting for Park and Jisoo.

== Release ==
In December 2024, the series premiered on Coupang Play on February 7, 2025, and was also be available to stream on Amazon Prime Video in around 240 regions.

== Reception ==
For the South China Morning Post, Pierce Conran gave the series 2.5 out of 5 stars, writing, "Newtopia is nowhere near as sharp as previous high points of this Korean subgenre – which include the film Train to Busan and previous series Kingdom and Happiness. The mise-en-scène is stylish and a colourful array of zombies, not to mention methods to dispatch them, litter the screen. It is in other areas where the show struggles, namely in tone and narrative. [...] For all its slick and stylised mayhem, Newtopia does not possess one iota of tension." Sarah Musnicky of But Why Tho? rated it a 5.5 out of 10, in particular criticising the character of Young-joo, who she called the "weakest link" in the show: "[She] doesn't come across as a fully developed character. In fact, the character aligns more with the damsel-in-distress archetype for the bulk of Newtopia, and a lot of the time, all she does is cry. [...] Jisoo's range is limited, as is her chemistry. [...] By the time Newtopia ends, this couple never hits that level of believability necessary to make this a successful rom-com."

Domestically, the critical response mirrored these concerns, with an additional focus on the production's social timing. Park Jung-sun of JTBC Ent News described the series as an "accidental controversial work," noting that the depiction of a zombie outbreak in Seoul alongside martial law and aviation disasters evoked a sense of "fatigue and discomfort" by mirroring contemporary social anxieties. While Park praised the chemistry between the lead actors, he questioned the production's approach, arguing that it often prioritized "unpleasantness over genre-based excitement." Similarly, Lee Da-won of Sports Kyunghyang offered a severe assessment, labeling the show "unpleasant" and criticizing the script as "lazy" for relying on "convenient" narrative choices for character survival. In a subsequent review, Lee argued that Jisoo's portrayal lacked the "sense of reality" required for the survival genre, describing her performance as "flat" and "excessively polished," which ultimately hindered the show's immersion.

== Accolades ==
Name of the award ceremony, year presented, category, nominee of the award, and the result of the nomination
Award ceremony	Year	Category	Nominee / Work	Result	Ref.
Asian Television Awards	2025	Best Drama Series (OTT)	Newtopia	Nominated	
Asian Television Awards	2025	Best Scriptwriting	Han Jin-won	Nominated	
Asian Television Awards	2025	Best Actor in a Leading Role	Park Jeong-min	Nominated	
Asian Television Awards	2025	Best Production Design (Drama)	Newtopia	Nominated	
Asian Television Awards	2025	Best Theme Song	Rebirth	Nominated	
ContentAsia Awards	2025	Best Male Lead in a TV Programme/Series Made in Asia	Park Jeong-min	Nominated	
Seoul International Drama Awards	2025	Outstanding Asian Star (South Korea)	Jisoo	Won	
