= Jisoo =

South Korean singer and actress (born 1995)

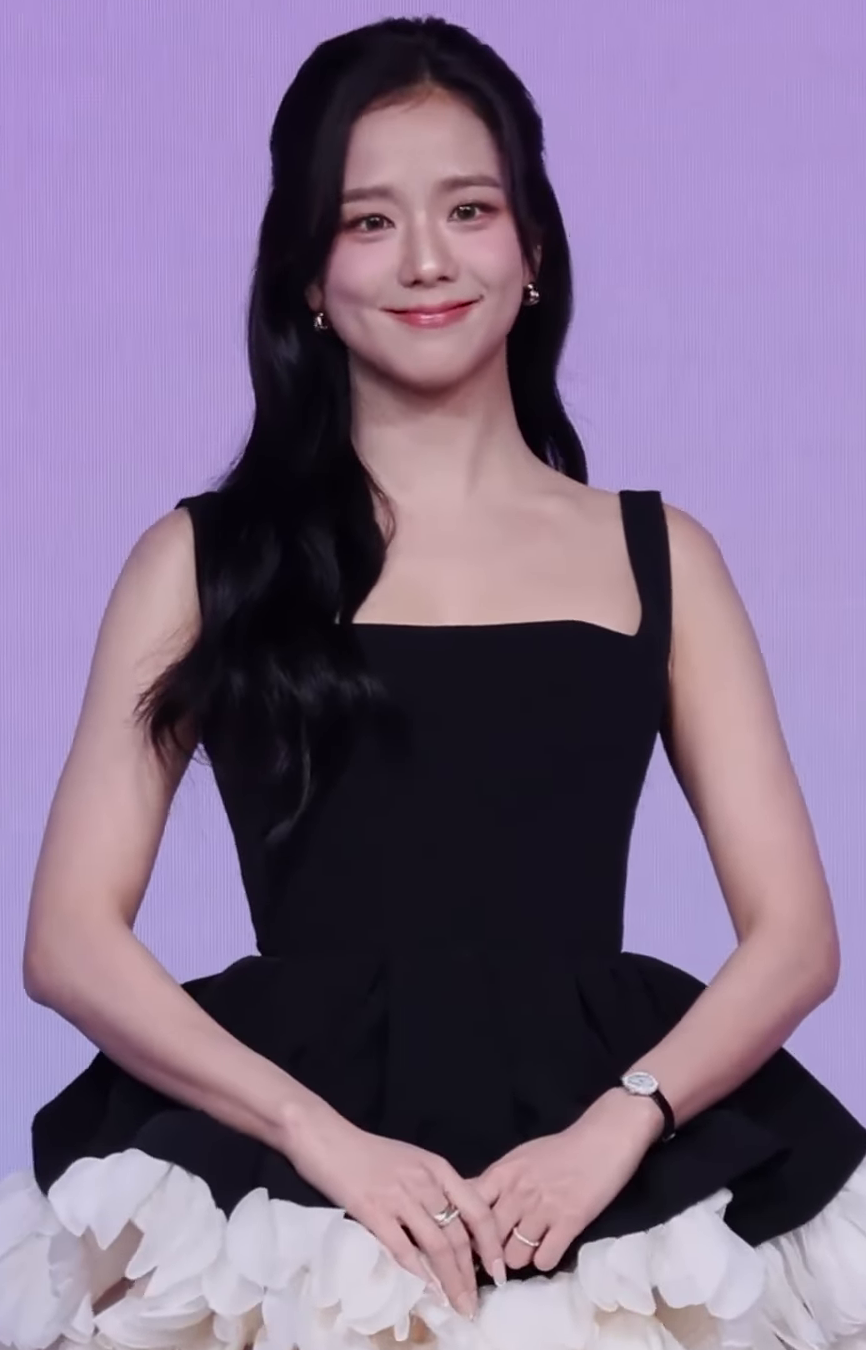
- Jisoo in February 2026
- Born: Kim Ji-soo; January 3, 1995 (age 31); Gunpo, South Korea
- Education: School of Performing Arts Seoul
- Occupations: Singer; songwriter; actress
- Years active: 2016–present
- Organization: Blissoo
- Awards: Full list (Note: For her awards received as a member of Blackpink, see List of awards and nominations received by Blackpink.)
- Honours: Okgwan Order of Cultural Merit (2026)
- Musical career
- Genres: K-pop; dance-pop; hip hop; trap; bubblegum pop
- Instrument: Vocals
- Labels: YG; Interscope; Blissoo; Warner
- Member of: Blackpink
- Website: jisoo.io

Korean name
- Hangul: 김지수
- RR: Gim Jisu
- MR: Kim Chisu

Kim Ji-soo (Korean: 김지수; born January 3, 1995), known mononymously as Jisoo, is a South Korean singer and actress. She rose to prominence as a member of the South Korean girl group Blackpink, which debuted under YG Entertainment in August 2016 and became one of the best-selling girl groups of all time.

In March 2023, Jisoo released her debut single album Me, which became the best-selling album by a Korean female soloist and the first to sell over a million copies. Its lead single "Flower" peaked at number two on the Billboard Global 200 and the Circle Digital Chart, and set records for the highest-charting song by a Korean female soloist on the Canadian Hot 100 and the UK Singles Chart. After establishing her own label named Blissoo in 2024 and signing with Warner Records in 2025, she released the EP Amortage and its single "Earthquake", which became her first number one on the US Billboard World Digital Songs chart. She achieved her first entry on the US Billboard Hot 100 in 2025 with "Eyes Closed".

Outside of music, Jisoo made her acting debut with a cameo role in the 2015 series The Producers. She played her first leading role in the JTBC series Snowdrop (2021–22), for which she won the Seoul International Drama Award for Outstanding Korean Actress. She has since starred in the series Newtopia (2025) and Boyfriend on Demand (2026). With over two million album sales, Jisoo is the best-selling female Korean soloist in Circle Chart history. Her accolades include two Golden Disc Awards, three MAMA Awards, a Circle Chart Music Award, and three Seoul International Drama Awards. Jisoo is the most-followed Korean actress on Instagram and has appeared on the Forbes Korea Power Celebrity 40 (2025–2026). She has been recognized for her influence in fashion as a global ambassador for Dior and Cartier.

== Life and career ==
=== 1995–2015: Early life and career beginnings ===
Kim Ji-soo was born on January 3, 1995, in Gunpo, South Korea. She has an older brother and sister. As a child, she played basketball and practiced taekwondo. She dreamt of becoming a painter and writer. She was a fan of the Korean boy group TVXQ. Jisoo attended high school at the School of Performing Arts Seoul; in 11th grade, she joined a drama club at the school and earned more experience in the entertainment industry by attending auditions. Until her professional debut, Jisoo lived with her parents, siblings, and grandparents. In addition to her native Korean, Jisoo has learned to speak Chinese and Japanese.

In 2011, Jisoo joined YG Entertainment as a trainee after passing its auditions. In October 2014, she appeared in Epik High's music video for "Spoiler + Happen Ending" as a heartbroken girl. The same year, she starred in Hi Suhyun's music video for "I'm Different" as Bobby's girlfriend. In 2015, Jisoo made a cameo appearance in the KBS2 drama The Producers with labelmates Sandara Park of 2NE1 and Kang Seung-yoon of Winner.

=== 2016–2022: Debut with Blackpink, solo endeavors and acting ===
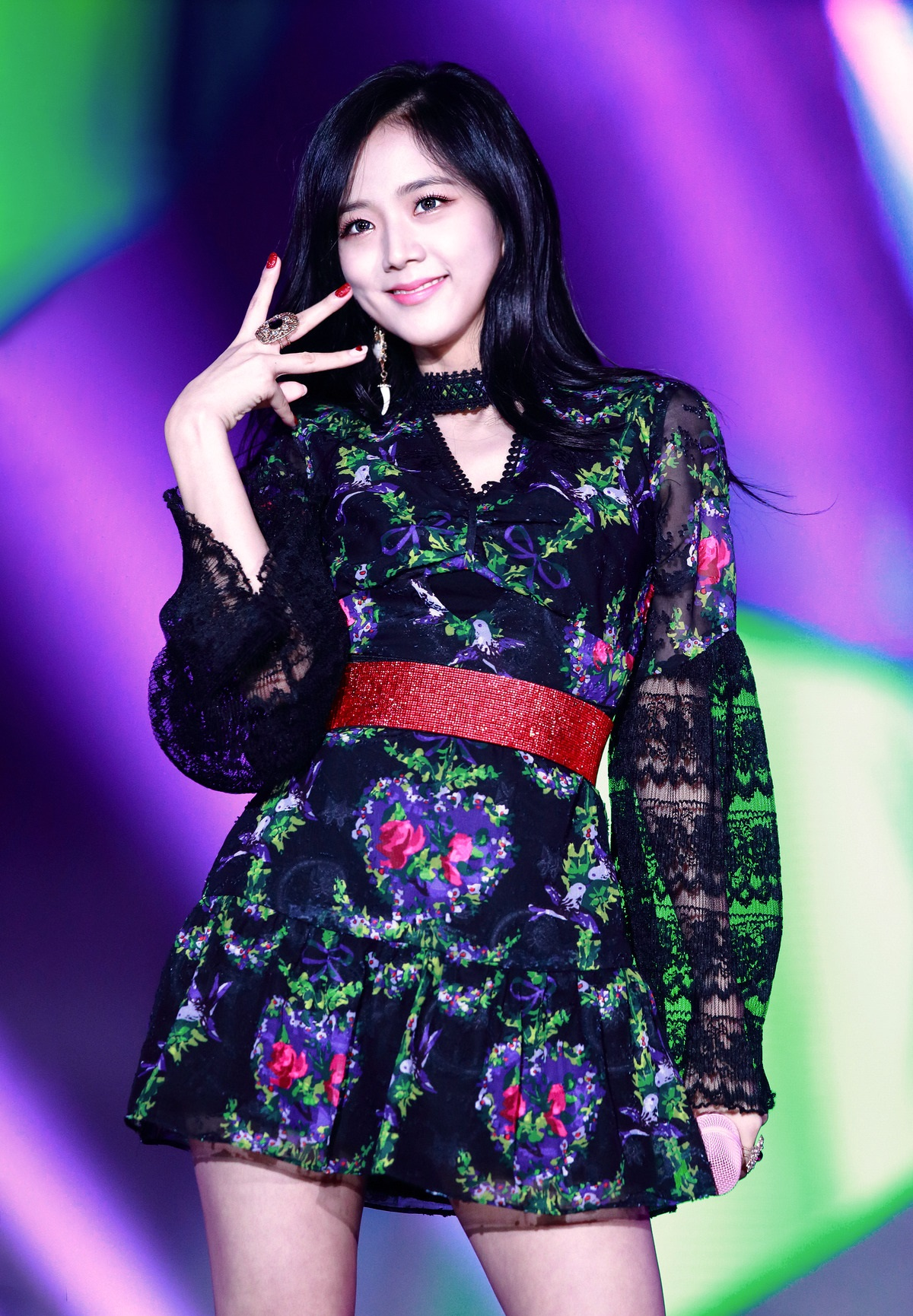
Jisoo performing at the Korea Music Festival in October 2017

Jisoo debuted as one of the four members of girl group Blackpink on August 8, 2016, alongside Jennie, Rosé and Lisa. The group's debut single album Square One featured the singles "Whistle", which topped the charts in South Korea, and "Boombayah." In 2018, Blackpink signed with Interscope Records in a global partnership with YG Entertainment.

From 2017 to 2018, Jisoo joined Inkigayo as a host alongside Got7's Jin-young and NCT's Doyoung. She first ventured into acting in 2019 with a short cameo appearance in the tvN fantasy drama Arthdal Chronicles as Song Joong-ki's love interest. In June 2020, Jisoo's style in the teasers for Blackpink's single "How You Like That" went viral on social media. Celebrities and influencers in South Korea, China, Thailand, and Vietnam replicated her "two-bow hairstyle" and makeup, which Jisoo created herself. Her "dot style", a makeup idea she originated, trended on social media platforms such as Instagram to promote the challenge among overseas fans. Jisoo took part as writer on "Lovesick Girls," the third single from Blackpink's first studio album The Album (2020).

In 2021, Jisoo had her first leading role in the JTBC television series Snowdrop, helmed by Sky Castle's writer Yoo Hyun-mi and director Jo Hyun-tak. She played a college freshman, Eun Yeong-ro, who is held hostage by her love interest Lim Soo-ho, a North Korean agent portrayed by Jung Hae-in. The show ranked number one on Disney+ in four out of the five countries it was made available in, including South Korea. In September 2022, Jisoo was awarded Outstanding Korean Actress at the Seoul International Drama Awards for her role in Snowdrop.

Jisoo contributed songwriting credits to "Yeah Yeah Yeah," the fourth track from Blackpink's second studio album, Born Pink (2022).

=== 2023–present: Me, film debut and independent label ===
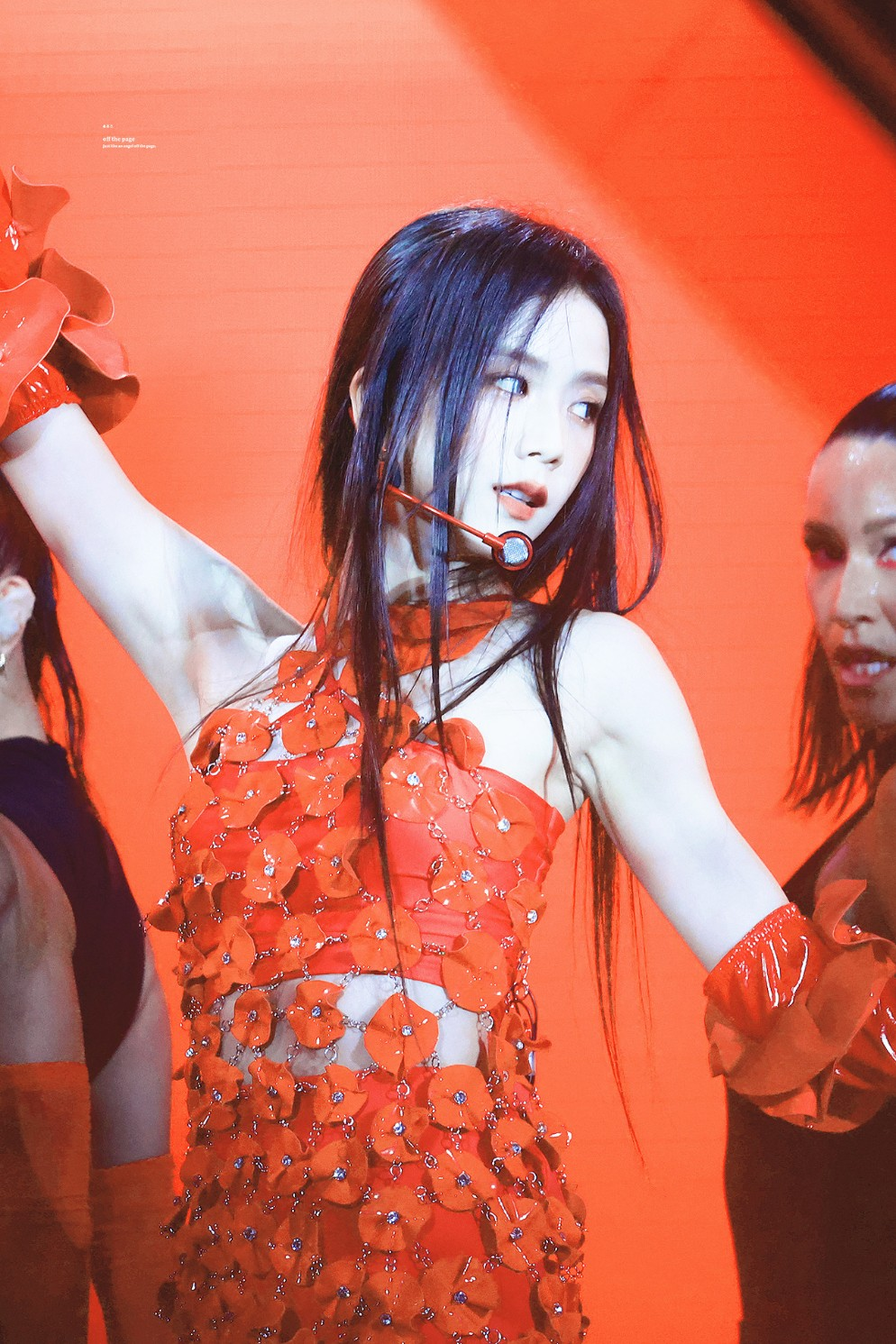
Jisoo performing "Flower" at Coachella 2023

On January 2, 2023, YG Entertainment announced that Jisoo would debut as a solo artist within the year and was in the process of recording music for her album. On February 21, her label revealed that filming for her music video was underway in a top-secret location overseas, with the highest production budget they have ever invested into a Blackpink music video. Jisoo's single album Me was released on March 31, 2023, containing the lead single "Flower" and B-side track "All Eyes on Me."

Me debuted at number one on the Circle Album Chart with 1.03 million copies sold in the first week of release. It broke the record for the best-selling album by a K-pop female soloist, becoming the first to sell a million copies within a week. The lead single "Flower" was a commercial success in South Korea, peaking at number two on the Circle Digital Chart and remaining in the top ten for 12 weeks. Internationally, the song debuted at number two on the Billboard Global 200 and earned the third-largest streaming start for an artist's debut track in the chart's history. It also became the highest-peaking song by a Korean female soloist on the Canadian Hot 100 and the UK Singles Chart. Jisoo promoted "Flower" by performing it on SBS's Inkigayo and went on to achieve nine music show wins on South Korean cable music programs, including Triple Crowns on Inkigayo and Show Champion. She performed the song during Blackpink's headlining concerts at Coachella in April and BST Hyde Park in July.

Jisoo made a special cameo appearance as a Korean traditional fairy in the film Dr. Cheon and Lost Talisman, which was released on September 27, 2023. On November 22, Jisoo was invested by King Charles III as an Honorary Member of the Order of the British Empire (MBE) alongside her bandmates during a special investiture at Buckingham Palace which was also attended by South Korean president Yoon Suk Yeol. On December 5, YG Entertainment announced that Jisoo along with the other members of Blackpink had renewed their contracts for group activities and that the members' individual contracts were still under discussion. YG Entertainment subsequently confirmed on December 29 that Jisoo and the other Blackpink members agreed not to proceed with a contract with the label for individual activities.

On February 21, 2024, Jisoo established her label Blissoo. On January 28, 2025, it was announced she signed a global label deal with Warner Records for her solo music. She released her first EP Amortage through Blissoo and Warner on February 14. The album sold 385,501 in its first day in South Korea, breaking the record for the highest sales debut of the year by a Korean solo artist. As of April 2025, the EP has sold 462,057 copies on the Circle Album Chart. Combined with 1.5 million sales of Me, Jisoo became the top-selling female K-pop soloist on the Circle Chart, with cumulative solo album sales exceeding 2 million. Amortage's lead single "Earthquake" was released alongside the EP and became her first number-one song on the US Billboard World Digital Songs chart.

Jisoo's next acting project was the lead role alongside Park Jeong-min in the zombie comedy series Newtopia. An adaptation of the novel Influenza by Han Sang-Hoon, the series was written by Han Jin-won, the writer of Parasite, and Ji Ho-jin and directed by Yoon Seong-hyun. The series aired from February to March 2025 at Coupang Play. Jisoo made her big screen debut in the action fantasy film Omniscient Reader: The Prophecy, the film adaptation of the webtoon Omniscient Reader's Viewpoint, of which she is said to be a fan. The film was released on July 23, 2025 and marked her first leading movie role as Lee Ji-hye alongside actor Lee Min-ho.

On October 10, 2025, Jisoo released the single "Eyes Closed", a duet with English singer Zayn. The song debuted at number 72 on the US Billboard Hot 100 and earned Jisoo her first entry on the chart as a solo artist. It also debuted at number 37 on UK Singles Chart and surpassed "Flower" as her highest-charting entry on the chart. Globally, the song debuted at number ten on the Billboard Global Excl. US, becoming Jisoo's second top-ten hit after "Flower" and Zayn's first.

In 2026, Jisoo starred in the Netflix romantic comedy television series Boyfriend on Demand alongside Seo In-guk. On September 4, she released the single "Click" as the lead single of her upcoming debut studio album. She also issued a single album consisting of the song and its instrumental. Jisoo released "Addicted" as the album's second single on October 30. On November 20, she released "Sun Showers" for the soundtrack to the animated comedy film The Angry Birds Movie 3 (2026).

== Impact ==
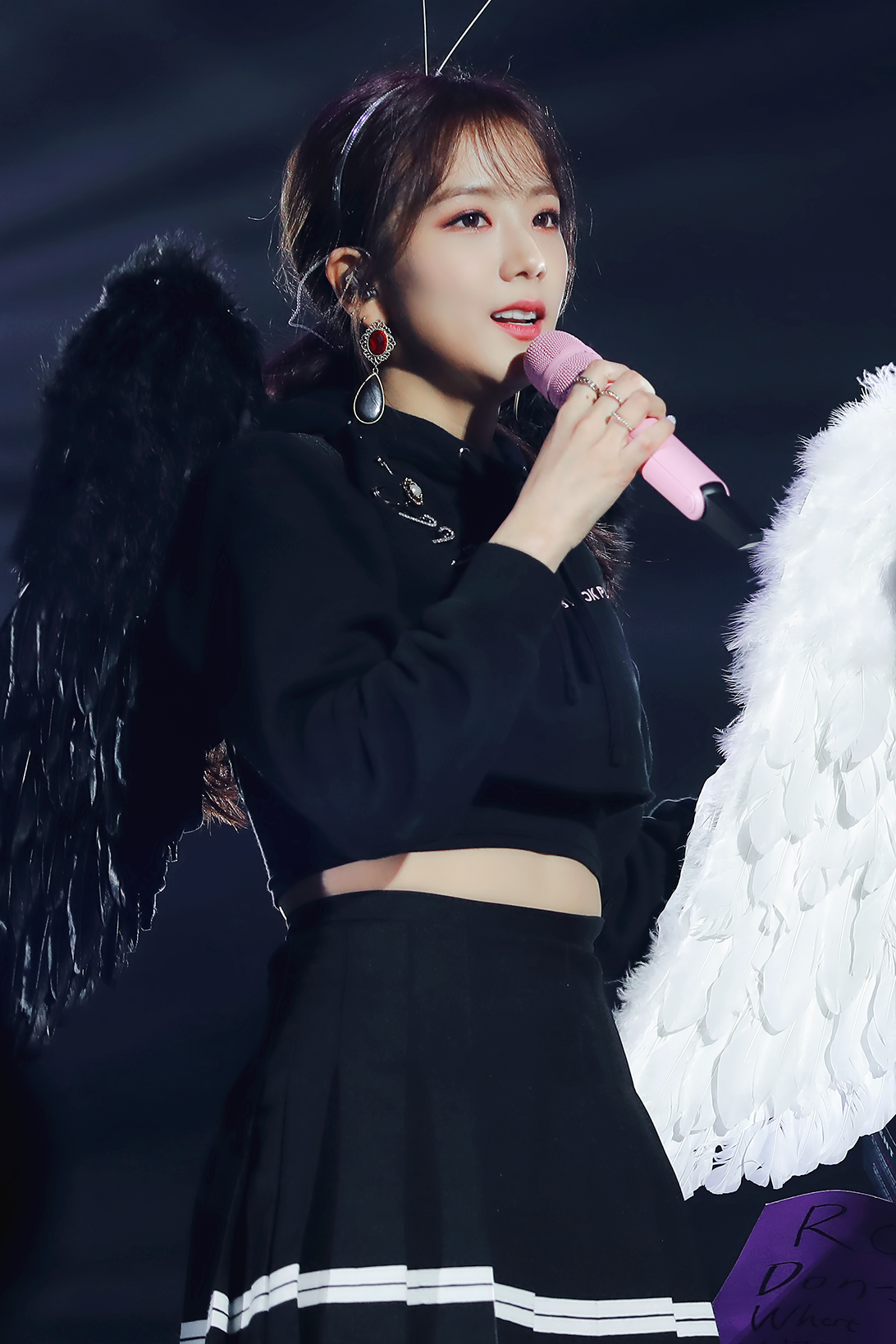
Jisoo in a June 2019 Sydney performance

Jisoo was ranked as the 10th most popular K-pop idol in 2018 and 17th in 2019 in annual surveys conducted by Gallup Korea. In 2019, she was ranked as the sixth most popular female K-pop idol in a survey of soldiers doing mandatory military service in South Korea. During the same year, Jisoo was the only one of two Korean singers added on the BoF 500 list, a "definitive professional index" of people shaping the $2.4 trillion fashion industry. In December 2022, Time recognized her as the most-followed Korean actress on Instagram, with over 66 million followers at the time. She is also the fourth most-followed K-pop idol behind her bandmates Lisa, Jennie and Rosé, achieving 79.5 million followers on the platform as of October 2024. Jisoo and her bandmates in Blackpink received the fourth-class Okgwan Order of Cultural Merit at the 2026 Korean Popular Culture and Arts Awards.

Jisoo was included in the ranking for the top ten celebrities and influencers leading the world of cosmetics for the first five months of 2020. Women's Wear Daily, a fashion industry trade journal, revealed that she led the ranking in average engagement per post, followed by Rihanna and Kylie Jenner. She placed 7th in the overall ranking despite having the fewest posts at just 12 in total. Jisoo was the only East Asian on the list.

Jisoo ranked first in the girl group's personal brand reputation list created by the Korea Enterprise Research Institute, which analyzed data from brands and online consumers habits to measure those with significant impact on brand consumption and interest. Director of the Korean Language Research Institute Seong-sun Lim noted the Korean wave in the global community was rapidly destroying the conventional Western cultural dominance, naming Jisoo and Jungkook as standards for world beauty over actors Olivia Hussey and James Dean.

In 2020, Dior's increase in sales during the COVID-19 pandemic in South Korea was also attributed to a marketing campaign with Korean pop singers, including Jisoo. She appeared in promotions for Dior's new Bobby bag alongside other prominent influencers such as Chiara Ferragni and Kat Graham. At the brand's Spring/Summer 2021 collection showcase, Jisoo garnered attention as a Korean representative. Her attendance at the showcase earned Dior its highest rated post, with average 33% media impact value (MIV), (Note: Media Impact Value is a proprietary algorithm developed by Launchmetrics to measure the impact of placements and mentions across different voices in the Fashion, Luxury, and Cosmetics (FLC) industry.) since its Fall 2020 show. In March 2021, creative director Maria Grazia Chiuri revealed that Dior's Autumn/Winter 2021 collection was inspired by Jisoo. It was also revealed that one of ten shades of Dior Addict Lip Glow lip balm, #025 Seoul Scarlet, was inspired by Korean women such as Jisoo.

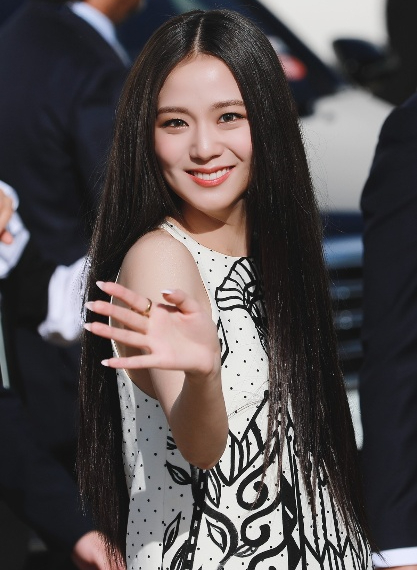
Jisoo at Dior Fall 2021

Her attendance at the Dior Spring/Summer 2022 collection show generated buzz both inside and outside of the Jardin des Tuileries venue. Jisoo became the public figure that generated the most MIV throughout Paris Fashion Week, with four photos on her personal Instagram valued at $1.84 million. Furthermore, she was the top celebrity for Dior's MIV, making up $15.7 million of the total $39.1 million generated with just two posts. In March, she generated the highest MIV for a social media post during Dior's Autumn/Winter 2022 fashion show at Paris Fashion Week, with one photo valued at $1.74 million. For the Fall/Winter 2024 season, Jisoo's three Instagram posts on Miss Dior-themed show generated approximately $11.8 million worth of Earned Media Value (EMV) for Dior, representing 26% of the brand's total EMV. Vogue Korea reported that, as a global ambassador for Cartier, Jisoo contributed 45% of the brand's total EMV in 2022 through 12 Instagram posts and 24 Instagram Stories. In 2024, Lefty named Jisoo the top fashion influencer in luxury, announcing that she had generated an average engagement rate of 5% and a total of $227 million in EMV. At the Spring/Summer 2025 New York Fashion Week, Jisoo's collaboration with Tommy Hilfiger generated $8 million in EMV, accounting for 6% of the event's total media impact.

In March 2021, the KartRider Rush+ app's ranking increased to 11th place after the announcement of design cooperation with Jisoo. The collaboration she participated in also received a positive response from users.

=== Philanthropy ===
On January 3, 2023, her 28th birthday, Jisoo created a personal YouTube channel, "Happy Jisoo 103%"; she said she would donate its proceeds to a charity, which was revealed on March 12, 2024, to be Save the Children. In March 2025, she donated ₩150 million to the Korean Red Cross for wildfire recovery efforts.

== Endorsements and fashion ==
Before her debut with Blackpink, Jisoo appeared in advertisements for Samsonite, Smart Uniform, LG Electronics, and Nikon. In September 2018, Jisoo and band-mate Rosé became endorsement models for Japanese cosmetics brand Kiss Me. In February 2021, Korean clothing brand It Michaa selected Jisoo as muse for their Spring 2021 collection. She was also appointed for 2021 summer campaign on It Michaa's line, For a Day Michaa. In August 2021, Jisoo was selected as the spokesperson for Korean short brand CELEBe. In March 2022, Jisoo became the brand ambassador for Nexon's game MapleStory, making her the second ambassador after Olympic archer Kim Je-deok. In December 2023, Dyson selected Jisoo as their official Brand Ambassador as a representative of the new Dyson hair care products. In January 2024, the American athletic apparel retailer Alo Yoga announced Jisoo as the new face for its Spring 2024 campaign. On March 6, 2024, Jisoo was selected as the new face of London fashion house Self-Portrait as part of its Spring 2024 collection, making her the first musician in the campaign.

=== Dior ===
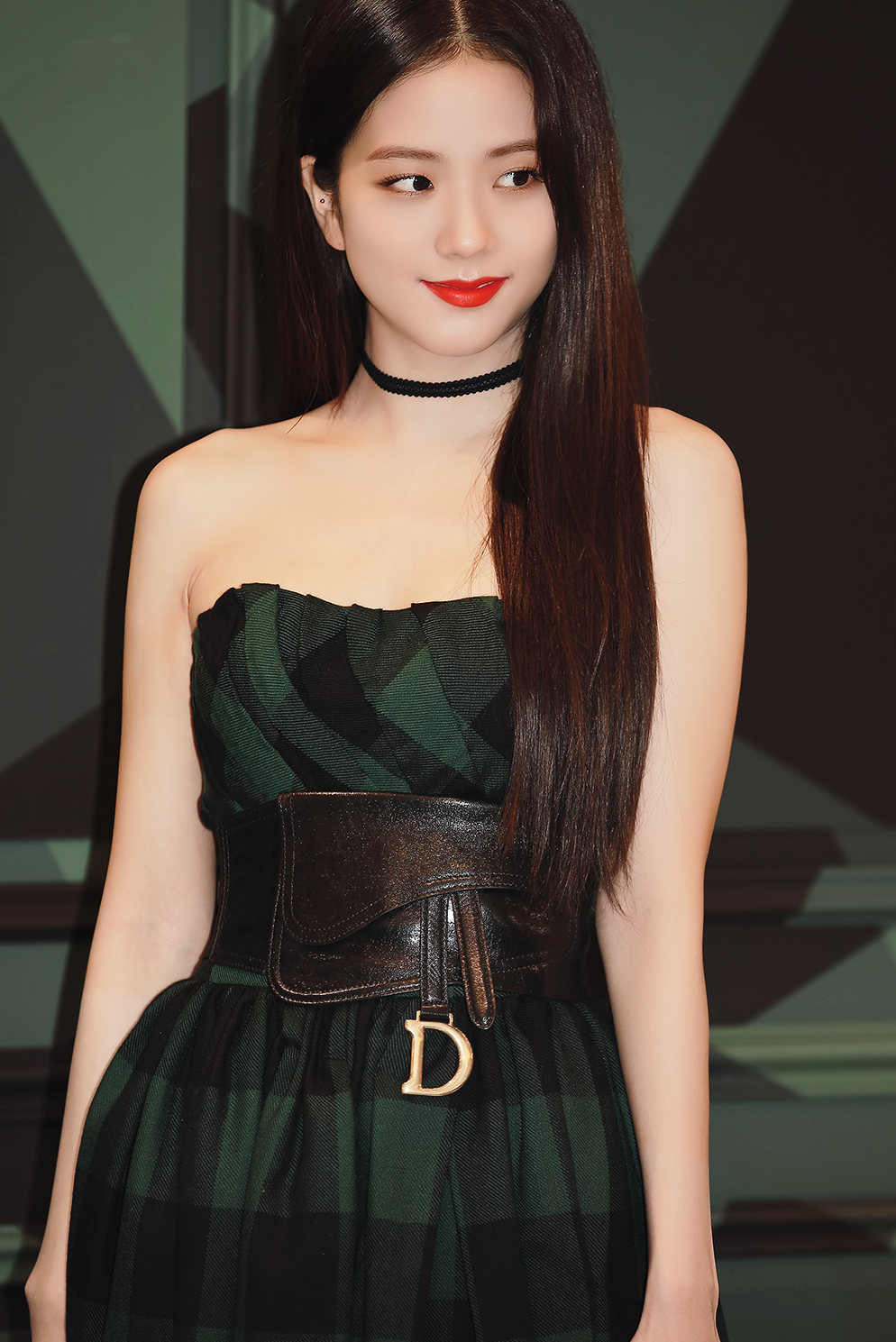
Jisoo at the Dior Pop-Up Store Opening Event in 2019

In December 2019, Jisoo became a local ambassador for Dior's cosmetics brand, Dior Beauty. The next summer, Jisoo was recruited to be Dior's muse and modelled for Dior's Fall/Winter 2020 collection. In September 2020, Jisoo covered the 155th edition 2020 of Dazed Korea, where she discussed her work with Dior. In December 2020, Jisoo was photographed with the Lady Dior and D'Lite bags in Dior's Cruise 2020–2021 Collection.

In January 2021, Dior Beauty's "Dior Forever Skin Glow Cushion", endorsed by Jisoo, was released exclusively in Korea. She also promoted the brand's Spring/Summer Collection, wearing Dior's Caro bag. The next March, Jisoo cemented her long-term partnership with Dior when they announced her as their new global ambassador, alongside Natalie Portman and Cara Delevingne. In May 2021, Jisoo embarked on her first collaboration project with the brand, fronting the Dior Fall '21 and Dior Vespa campaigns as Elle magazine's June cover star, which hit shelves in four countries—Hong Kong, Thailand, Singapore and India. Jisoo modeled Dior's newly launched lip balm, Dior Addict Lip Glow, for the Dior Beauty series.

In June 2021, Jisoo attended the Dior Resort 2022 show at Greece's Panathenaic Stadium, wearing all-white linen dress by creative director Maria Grazia Chiuri. In September 2021, Jisoo attended Dior's Womenswear Spring/Summer 2022 show, held during the 2021 Paris Fashion Week at Jardin des Tuileries. She sat in the front row, next to the chairman and CEO of Dior, Pietro Beccari. Ahead of the show, her journey to Paris was documented on Dior's social media accounts, showcasing moments ranging from her visit to the house's ateliers and the inspiration behind the Spring/Summer 2022 collection and to the archives of Lady Dior, named after Princess Diana.

In February 2022, Jisoo became the face of Dior's Addict lipstick collection along with fellow ambassadors Anya Taylor-Joy and Sharon Alexie. In honor of her 28th birthday, Dior released a new shade of lipgloss, "031 Strawberry". In March 2022, Jisoo attended the Dior Fall/Winter 2022 runway show during Paris Fashion Week. She documented her experience in a video diary, sharing insights into the show's themes and her favorite pieces. In April, Jisoo attended Dior's first-ever Fall 2022 show in South Korea, held at Ewha Womans University in Seoul. She wore a lace black gown from Dior's Winter 2022–2023 collection, paired with Dior slingback heels and a black Lady Dior handbag. The same month, she starred in a special shoot for Dior's Spring/Summer 2022 collection, showcasing vibrant, mod-inspired looks that drew from the 1960s. At the Dior Spring/Summer 2023 show in Paris, Jisoo wore a strapless black mini dress with a bubble hem and accessorized with a Mini Lady D-Lite Bag.

In January 2023, Jisoo attended the Dior Haute Couture Spring 2023 show. Prior to attending the Dior Fall/Winter 2023–2024 show in February, she visited the Dior archives to learn about the brand's history and inspirations. She expressed particular interest in the story of Catherine Dior, Christian Dior's sister, and her influence on the brand.

In September 2024, Jisoo was present at the Dior Spring/Summer 2025 show in Paris, and featured in a Lady Dior campaign showcasing her in various versions of the Lady Dior bag. The same month, Dior's Director of Perfume Creation, Francis Kurkdjian, crafted an exclusive fragrance specifically for Jisoo. This bespoke scent was presented to her with a personal note expressing the unique creation made solely for her.

In 2025, Jisoo attended the Dior Haute Couture Spring-Summer 2025 show and the Dior Fall 2025 show.

=== Cartier ===
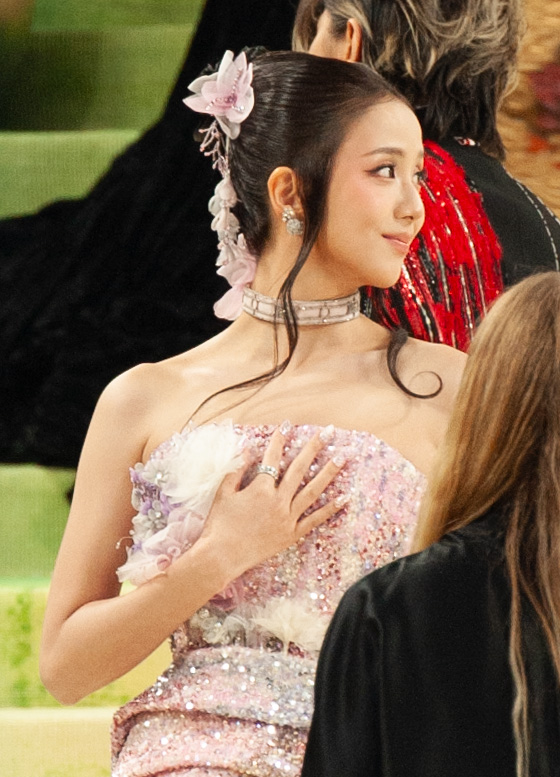
Jisoo wore a Dior gown and Cartier jewelry to the 2026 Met Gala.

In September 2020, Jisoo was appointed as the main model of Cartier's Pasha de Cartier. On May 25, 2022, Cartier announced Jisoo as their brand ambassador joining the Panthère de Cartier community which includes Annabelle Wallis, Ella Balinska, Chang Chen, Mariacarla Boscono and Yasmine Sabri. Ahead of Cartier celebrations of Trinity's centenary, Jisoo is one of the stars campaign among Yara Shahidi, Paul Mescal, Labrinth, and Jackson Wang. At a Cartier event in Singapore in July 2024, Jisoo and other celebrities like Roh Yoon-seo, Jackson Wang and Jeff Satur took part in the event to celebrate the centenary of the Cartier Trinity collection, as well as a pop-up for the collection at The Arts House from July 15 to 23. In March 2025, Jisoo attended "Le Grand Dîner du Louvre" at the Louvre Museum, where she debuted Cartier's exclusive Panthère de Cartier collection.

=== Tommy Hilfiger ===
In October 2024, Jisoo was announced as a global ambassador for Tommy Hilfiger and featured in the brand's Fall 2024 campaign. In 2025, she was the face of the brand's New Year and Spring campaigns.

=== Collaborations ===
In February 2021, Line Friends announced Jisoo as their exclusive partner to design a character in mobile game KartRider Rush+, which would be released on March 19, 2021. She personally sketched items and idea of the character herself. Her items included Chichi, a rabbit inspired by Jisoo's nickname "Turtle Rabbit Kim" among fans, and Dalgom, also the name of her pet. Both Chichi and Dalgom were developed into stickers on the platform Line Messenger.

In commemorative success of Jisoo x Alo spring campaign, she expanded her athleisure collaboration with Alo, she personalized features of a dream pink sunset sneaker star charms, representing Jisoo’s hand drawn character Shumon, and the number 103 in celebrating her birthday.

== Discography ==
=== Extended plays ===
List of extended plays, with selected details, selected chart positions, sales, and certifications
Title	Details	Peak chart positions								Sales	Certifications
Title	Details	KOR	CRO	GRC	HUN Phy.	JPN	POR	SWI	US Sales	Sales	Certifications
Amortage	Released: February 14, 2025; Label: Blissoo, Warner; Formats: CD, LP, Kit, NFC, digital download, streaming	1	4	12	39	50	160	86	11	KOR: 630,460; JPN: 898 (Note: Japanese sales of Amortage: Physical sales: 632; Digital sales: 266); US: 7,000	KMCA: Platinum

=== Single albums ===
List of single albums, with selected details, selected chart positions, sales, and certifications
Title	Details	Peak chart positions				Sales	Certifications
Title	Details	KOR	HUN	JPN	JPN Cmb.	Sales	Certifications
Me	Released: March 31, 2023; Label: YG, Interscope; Formats: CD, LP, digital download, streaming	1	2	24	46	KOR: 1,550,058; JPN: 1,960	KMCA: Million
Click	Released: September 4, 2026; Label: Blissoo, Warner; Formats: CD, LP, NFC, digital download, streaming	3	—	—	—	KOR: 138,531	
"—" denotes a recording that did not chart or was not released in that territory.

=== Singles ===
List of singles, with year released, selected chart positions, sales, certifications, and album name
Title	Year	Peak chart positions										Sales	Certifications	Album
Title	Year	KOR	CAN	HK	JPN Hot	NZ	SGP	TWN	UK	US	WW	Sales	Certifications	Album
"Flower" (꽃)	2023	2	30	1	45	40	1	1	38	— (Note: "Flower" did not enter the Billboard Hot 100, but peaked at number 4 on the Bubbling Under Hot 100 chart.)	2	US: 6,000; WW: 21,000	MC: Gold	Me
"Earthquake"	2025	41	—	3	—	— (Note: "Earthquake" did not enter the NZ Top 40 Singles Chart, but peaked at number 12 on the NZ Hot Singles Chart.)	9	2	— (Note: "Earthquake" did not enter the UK Singles Chart, but peaked at number 11 on the UK Singles Downloads Chart.)	—	47			Amortage
"Eyes Closed" (with Zayn)	2025	128	39	5	37	— (Note: "Eyes Closed did not enter the NZ Top 40 Singles Chart, but peaked at number 1 on the NZ Hot Singles Chart.)	5	4	37	72	20	US: 2,000; WW: 5,000		Non-album single
"Click"	2026	93	—	—	39	— (Note: "Click" did not enter the NZ Top 40 Singles Chart, but peaked at number 11 on the NZ Hot Singles Chart.)	— (Note: "Click" did not enter the Official Singapore Chart, but peaked at number 10 on the Regional Chart.)	14	— (Note: "Click" did not enter the UK Singles Chart, but peaked at number 29 on the UK Singles Downloads Chart.)	—	— (Note: "Click" did not enter the Billboard Global 200, but peaked at number 96 on the Billboard Global Excl. US.)			TBA
"Addicted"	2026	197	—	—	—	— (Note: "Addicted" did not enter the NZ Top 40 Singles Chart, but peaked at number 20 on the NZ Hot Singles Chart.)	— (Note: "Addicted" did not enter the Official Singapore Chart, but peaked at number 15 on the Regional Chart.)	23	— (Note: "Addicted" did not enter the UK Singles Chart, but peaked at number 16 on the UK Singles Downloads Chart.)	—	—			TBA
"Sun Showers"	2026	—	—	—	—	—	—	—	—	—	—			The Angry Birds Movie 3
"—" denotes a recording that did not chart or was not released in that territory.

=== Other charted songs ===
List of other charted songs, with year released, selected chart positions, sales, and album name
Title	Year	Peak chart positions										Sales	Album
Title	Year	KOR	HK	MLY Songs	NZ Hot	PHL	SGP	TWN	US World	VIE Hot	WW	Sales	Album
"All Eyes on Me"	2023	102	15	8	18	19	11	6	6	6	78	US: 3,000	Me
"Your Love"	2025	197	—	—	23	—	— (Note: "Your Love" did not enter the Official Singapore Chart, but peaked at number 12 on the Regional Chart.)	—	—	—	—		Amortage
"Tears"	2025	— (Note: "Tears" did not enter the Circle Digital Chart, but peaked at number 41 on the Circle Download Chart.)	—	—	39	—	— (Note: "Tears" did not enter the Official Singapore Chart, but peaked at number 22 on the Regional Chart.)	—	—	—	—		Amortage
"Hugs & Kisses"	2025	— (Note: "Hugs & Kisses" did not enter the Circle Digital Chart, but peaked at number 43 on the Circle Download Chart.)	—	—	33	—	— (Note: "Hugs & Kisses" did not enter the Official Singapore Chart, but peaked at number 19 on the Regional Chart.)	—	—	—	—		Amortage
"—" denotes a recording that did not chart or was not released in that territory.

=== Songwriting credits ===
All song credits are adapted from the Korea Music Copyright Association and American Society of Composers, Authors and Publishers databases, unless otherwise noted.

List of songs, with year released, artist name, and album name
Year	Artist	Song	Album	Lyricist		Composition	
Year	Artist	Song	Album	Credited	With	Credited	With
2020	Blackpink	"Lovesick Girls"	The Album	Yes	Løren, Danny Chung, Jennie, Teddy	No	N/A
2022	Blackpink	"Yeah Yeah Yeah"	Born Pink	Yes	VVN, Kush, Rosé	No	N/A
2025	Herself	"Earthquake"	Amortage	Yes	Jack Brady, Jordan Roman, Sarah Troy, Sara Boe	Yes	Jack Brady, Jordan Roman, Sarah Troy, Sara Boe
2025	Herself	"Your Love"	Amortage	Yes	Jack Brady, Jordan Roman, Violet Skies, Lilian Caputo, Jenna Raine	Yes	Jack Brady, Jordan Roman, Violet Skies, Lilian Caputo, Jenna Raine
2025	Herself	"Tears"	Amortage	Yes	Jack Brady, Jordan Roman, Kristin Carpenter, Sophie Simmons	Yes	Jack Brady, Jordan Roman, Kristin Carpenter, Sophie Simmons
2025	Herself	"Hugs & Kisses"	Amortage	Yes	Jack Brady, Jordan Roman, Austin Wolfe, Chloe Copeloff	Yes	Jack Brady, Jordan Roman, Austin Wolfe, Chloe Copeloff
2025	Herself and Zayn	"Eyes Closed"	Non-album single	Yes	Alex Hope, Amanda "Kiddo" Ibanez, Isaiah Tejada, Jordan Johnson, Mikky Ekko, Nick Long, Stefan Johnson, Zayn	Yes	Alex Hope, Amanda "Kiddo" Ibanez, Isaiah Tejada, Jordan Johnson, Mikky Ekko, Nick Long, Stefan Johnson, Zayn
2025	Nmixx	"Spinnin' on It"	Blue Valentine	Yes	3! (lalala studio), Error404, Kang Eun-jeong, Lee Hyeong-ju (lalala studio), Oh Hyun-sun (lalala studio), Shin Sa-gang (XYXX), Since	Yes	Anders Gukko, C'SA, Julie Yu, Lee Woo-min "collapsedone", Fredrik "Fredro" Ödesjö, Rebbi James, Sandra Wikström
2026	Blackpink	"Go"	Deadline	Yes	Rosé, Jennie, Lisa, Chris Martin, Henry Walter, Danny Chung	No	N/A
2026	Herself	"Click"	TBA	Yes	Sir Nolan, Simon Says, Caroline Ailin, Simon Wilcox	Yes	Sir Nolan, Simon Says, Caroline Ailin, Simon Wilcox
2026	Herself	"Addicted"	TBA	Yes	Austin Wolfe, Tiina Vainikainen	No	N/A
2026	Herself	"Sun Showers"	Non-album single	Yes	Bailey Flores, Gabe Reali, Jack Brady, Jordan Roman	Yes	Bailey Flores, Gabe Reali, Jack Brady, Jordan Roman

== Videography ==
=== Music videos ===
Title	Year	Director(s)	Length	Ref.
"Flower"	2023	Han Sa-min	3:04	
"Earthquake"	2025	Christian Breslauer	4:25	
"Your Love"	2025	Choann Studio	2:55	
"Eyes Closed" (with Zayn)	2025	Frank Borin and Ivanna Borin	3:12	
"Click"	2026	Joseph Kahn	2:49	
"Addicted"	2026	TBA	2:59	
"Sun Showers"	2026	John Rice	2:52	

== Filmography ==
=== Film ===
Year	Title	Role	Notes	Ref.
2023	Dr. Cheon and Lost Talisman	Korean traditional fairy	Cameo	
2025	Omniscient Reader: The Prophecy	Lee Ji-hye		

=== Television ===
Year	Title	Role	Notes	Ref.
2015	The Producers	Herself	Cameo (episode 4)	
2017	Part-Time Idol	Herself	Cameo (episode 5)	
2019	Arthdal Chronicles	Sae Na-rae	Cameo (episode 7)	
2021–2022	Snowdrop	Eun Young-ro		
2025	Newtopia	Kang Young-joo		
2026	Boyfriend on Demand	Seo Mi-rae		

=== Hosting ===
Year	Title	Notes	Ref.
2017–2018	Inkigayo	With Jinyoung and Doyoung	
2017	Inkigayo Super Concert in Daejeon	With V and Jinyoung	

=== Music video appearances ===
Year	Title	Artist	Ref.
2014	"Spoiler + Happen Ending"	Epik High	
2014	"I'm Different"	Hi Suhyun	

== Live performances ==
=== Fanmeeting tours ===
Title	Date	City	Country	Venue	Ref.
Lights, Love, Action!	March 14, 2025	Quezon City (Note: Promoted as Manila)	Philippines	Smart Araneta Coliseum	
Lights, Love, Action!	March 15, 2025	Bangkok	Thailand	Queen Sirikit Convention Center	
Lights, Love, Action!	March 17, 2025	Saitama (Note: Promoted as Tokyo)	Japan	Saitama Super Arena	
Lights, Love, Action!	March 18, 2025	Saitama	Japan	Saitama Super Arena	
Lights, Love, Action!	March 21, 2025	Macau	China	Galaxy Arena	
Lights, Love, Action!	March 22, 2025	Macau	China	Galaxy Arena	
Lights, Love, Action!	March 23, 2025	Taoyuan (Note: Promoted as Taipei)	Taiwan	Messe Taoyuan	
Lights, Love, Action!	March 28, 2025	Hong Kong	China	AsiaWorld–Arena	
Lights, Love, Action!	March 29, 2025	Hong Kong	China	AsiaWorld–Arena	
Lights, Love, Action!	March 30, 2025	Hanoi	Vietnam	My Dinh Indoor Athletics Arena	

=== Music festivals ===
Event	Date	City	Country	Venue	Ref.
SBS Gayo Daejeon	December 25, 2026	Goyang	South Korea	Korea International Exhibition Center	
Coachella	April 9, 2027 – April 16, 2027	Indio	United States	Empire Polo Club	

=== Television shows and specials ===
Event	Date	City	Country	Performed song(s)	Ref.
Inkigayo	April 9, 2023	Seoul	South Korea	"Flower"	
Inkigayo	April 16, 2023	Seoul	South Korea	"Flower"	
Inkigayo	February 16, 2025	Seoul	South Korea	"Earthquake"	
Inkigayo	February 23, 2025	Seoul	South Korea	"Earthquake"	
Show! Music Core	November 7, 2026	Seoul	South Korea	"Addicted"	
Inkigayo	November 8, 2026	Seoul	South Korea	"Addicted"	
Music Bank	November 13, 2026	Seoul	South Korea	"Addicted"	
