= Earthquake (Jisoo song) =

2025 single by Jisoo

- Promotional graphic

Single by Jisoo

from the EP Amortage
- Language: Korean; English
- Released: February 14, 2025
- Studio: BK (Seoul); Wavy Baby West (Los Angeles)
- Genre: Electropop
- Length: 3:10
- Label: Blissoo; Warner
- Songwriters: Jisoo; Jack Brady; Jordan Roman; Sarah Troy; Sara Boe
- Producers: Blissoo; The Wavys

Jisoo singles chronology
| "Flower" (2023) | "Earthquake" (2025) | "Eyes Closed" (2025) |

Music video
- "Earthquake" on YouTube

"Earthquake" is a song by South Korean singer Jisoo. It was released through Blissoo and Warner Records on February 14, 2025, as the lead single from her debut extended play, Amortage (2025). It marked Jisoo's first single under her own label since departing from YG Entertainment and Interscope Records as a solo artist in 2023. An electropop song about the excitement of new love, "Earthquake" was written by Jisoo with Sarah Troy, Sara Boe and the Wavys, and produced by the latter with Blissoo.

"Earthquake" received positive reviews for its catchy quality and upgraded production as compared to her debut single "Flower" (2023). It became Jisoo's first number-one song on the US Billboard World Digital Songs chart and peaked at number 47 on the Billboard Global 200. The song also peaked at number 41 on South Korea's Circle Digital Chart and entered the top ten in Hong Kong, Malaysia, Singapore, Taiwan, and Vietnam.

An accompanying music video, directed by Christian Breslauer, was uploaded on Jisoo's YouTube channel simultaneously with the single's release. It shows the singer dealing with an unexpected text message from her lover at work and being interrogated with a lie detector test about her true feelings for him. Jisoo promoted "Earthquake" with performances at the South Korean music program Inkigayo, on her fanmeet tour Lights, Love, Action! in Asia, and on Blackpink's Deadline World Tour. The song received a nomination for Best K-Pop at the 2025 MTV Video Music Awards.

== Background and release ==
Jisoo announced her departure from YG Entertainment for solo activities in December 2023 and established her own label named Blissoo in February 2024. On January 26, 2025, she revealed that she would be releasing her debut extended play Amortage on Valentine's Day. She announced on January 28 that she had signed a global label deal with Warner Records for her solo music. On February 4, Jisoo unveiled the tracklist and credits for the EP, including the lead single "Earthquake". The same day, she released a concept poster for the single, which provided a hint with the phrase: "Wake up, electric touch." She later released a music video teaser on February 12, followed by a poster for the music video on February 13, which contained a Polaroid of Jisoo with lettering for "Earthquake" and the caption "One day left, D-1". "Earthquake" was released as the lead single of Amortage alongside the rest of the EP on February 14. An English version of the single was released as an online-exclusive bonus track available for purchase on Jisoo's official website with the EP.

== Composition and lyrics ==
"Earthquake" has been described as a "shape-shifting, electronic-pop" song with a "hook-laden production" reminiscent of Britney Spears's "experimental-yet-accessible" music and as addictive as Kylie Minogue's "Padam Padam" (2023). The song combines electronic sounds with Jisoo's attractive voice, and contains a Korean sound similar to her previous single "Flower" and a repetitive chorus. Lyrically, it expresses the "excitement of starting a love and intense feelings toward the other person".

== Critical reception ==
Professional ratings
Review scores
| Source | Rating |
|---|---|
| IZM | 2/5 stars |

Writing for NME, Crystal Bell praised "Earthquake" as an evolution of the "magnetic syncopation" of Jisoo's single "Flower" with a "fuller, more dynamic production", which she felt enhanced the singer's vocals helping her delivery feel "more assured and expressive". Billboard's Jeff Benjamin ranked it as the second-best song from Amortage, finding it the "most impactful track" and best-suited as a single to mark her first solo comeback in two years with a bang. He noted the song's "similar catchy quality" to "Flower" with a "noticeably upgraded sophistication" and commended the progress Jisoo made in two years to improve her craft. Screen Rant described "Earthquake" as one of the EP's "highest points", finding the partially empty chorus "beneficial to the rest of the song in how her vocals are woven into the instrumental."

Writing for Rolling Stone India, Debashree Dutta placed "Earthquake" on their list of the best K-pop songs of the year and called it a "highlight in her discography". She praised Jisoo's "intimate, urgent delivery", shifting between vulnerability and confidence, alongside the driving beat for giving the song a "pulsating, roller‑coaster energy."

== Accolades ==
"Earthquake" won two first-place awards on South Korean music programs.

Awards and nominations for "Earthquake"
| Year | Organization | Award | Result | Ref. |
|---|---|---|---|---|
| 2025 | Asian Pop Music Awards | Top 20 Songs of the Year | Won | |
| 2025 | Asian Pop Music Awards | Best Dance Performance | Nominated | |
| 2025 | Asian Pop Music Awards | Song of the Year | Nominated | |
| 2025 | Korea Grand Music Awards | Best Music Video | Nominated | |
| 2025 | MAMA Awards | Best Dance Performance Female Solo | Nominated | |
| 2025 | MAMA Awards | Song of the Year | Nominated | |
| 2025 | MTV Video Music Awards | Best K-Pop | Nominated | |
| 2025 | UK Music Video Awards | Best Production Design in a Video | Nominated | |
| 2025 | UK Music Video Awards | Best Visual Effects in a Video | Nominated | |
| 2026 | KM Chart Awards | Best Popular Song Award | Nominated | |

Music program awards
| Program | Date | Ref. |
|---|---|---|
| Inkigayo | March 2, 2025 | |
| M Countdown | February 27, 2025 | |

== Music video ==
The music video for "Earthquake" was directed by Christian Breslauer and released alongside the single on February 14, 2025, on Jisoo's YouTube channel. It was preceded by a teaser released two days earlier on February 12. The music video surpassed 100 million views on YouTube on February 7, 2026.

In the video, Jisoo picks up her phone while working in an office to respond to an unexpected text message from her lover. However, her phone is snatched out of her hands and placed into an evidence bag before she can press send. She is interrogated by an officer, played by the actor Cha Seung-won, with a lie detector test about her true feelings for her love interest. Jisoo gets in a car that breaks through the interrogation room and begins to drive.

== Live performances and other usage ==
On February 16, 2025, Jisoo performed "Earthquake" live for the first time on the South Korean music program Inkigayo, broadcast by SBS. She performed the song again on the program on February 23. Jisoo also performed the song on Lights, Love, Action!, a fanmeet tour spanning seven cities across Asia. "Earthquake" was later included in Blackpink's Deadline World Tour setlist as a part of Jisoo's solo set.

"Earthquake" was added to the rotation at Flash FM, the in-game pop radio station in the 2026 video game Grand Theft Auto VI.

== Track listing ==
- Digital download and streaming
1. "Earthquake" – 3:10
- Digital download and streaming – Sam Feldt remix
1. "Earthquake" (Sam Feldt remix) – 2:29

== Credits and personnel ==
Credits are adapted from the liner notes of Amortage.

Recording

- Recorded at BK Studio (Seoul, South Korea) and Wavy Baby West Studio (Los Angeles, California)
- Mixed at Larrabee Studios (North Hollywood, California)
- Mastered at Sterling Sound (Edgewater, New Jersey)

Personnel

- Jisoo – vocals, songwriter
- The Wavys – producer
  - Jack Brady – songwriter, recording engineer
  - Jordan Roman – songwriter
- Sarah Troy – songwriter, background vocals
- Sara Boe – songwriter
- Blissoo – producer
- Manny Marroquin – mix engineer
- Zach Pereyra – assistant mix engineer
- Anthony Vilchis – assistant mix engineer
- Trey Station – assistant mix engineer
- Chris Gehringer – mastering engineer

== Charts ==
=== Weekly charts ===
Weekly chart performance
| Chart (2025) | Peak position |
|---|---|
| China (TME Korean) | 1 |
| Global 200 (Billboard) | 47 |
| Hong Kong (Billboard) | 3 |
| Malaysia (IFPI) | 10 |
| New Zealand Hot Singles (RMNZ) | 12 |
| Nicaragua Anglo Airplay (Monitor Latino) | 3 |
| Philippines (Philippines Hot 100) | 56 |
| Singapore (RIAS) | 9 |
| South Korea (Circle) | 41 |
| Taiwan (Billboard) | 2 |
| UK Singles Downloads (Official Charts) | 11 |
| UK Singles Sales (OCC) | 13 |
| UK Video Streaming (OCC) | 19 |
| US World Digital Song Sales (Billboard) | 1 |
| Vietnam (IFPI) | 3 |

=== Monthly charts ===
Monthly chart performance
| Chart (2025) | Peak position |
|---|---|
| South Korea (Circle) | 50 |

=== Year-end charts ===
Year-end chart performance for "Earthquake"
| Chart (2025) | Position |
|---|---|
| South Korea (Circle) | 178 |

== Release history ==
Release dates and formats
| Region | Date | Format | Version | Label | Ref. |
|---|---|---|---|---|---|
| Various | February 14, 2025 | Digital download; streaming | Original | Blissoo; Warner | |
| Italy | February 14, 2025 | Radio airplay | Original | Warner Italy | |
| Various | March 14, 2025 | Digital download; streaming | Sam Feldt remix | Blissoo; Warner | |

== See also ==
- List of Inkigayo Chart winners (2025)
- List of K-pop songs on the Billboard charts
- List of M Countdown Chart winners (2025)
