= Amortage =

- Digital cover

EP by Jisoo
- Released: February 14, 2025
- Recorded: 2024
- Studios: BK (Seoul); Wavy Baby West (Los Angeles)
- Genre: Bubblegum pop
- Length: 12:14
- Languages: English; Korean
- Labels: Blissoo; Warner
- Producers: Blissoo; The Wavys

Jisoo chronology
Me (2023)	Amortage (2025)

Singles from Amortage
- 1. "Earthquake" Released: February 14, 2025

Amortage is the debut extended play by South Korean singer Jisoo. Released on February 14, 2025 by Blissoo and Warner Records, the EP marks Jisoo's first solo release after departing from YG Entertainment and Interscope Records in 2023. Consisting of four tracks in both Korean and English, it is a bubblegum pop record that explores the various stages of love.

Amortage received positive reviews from critics for its versatile concept, dynamic production, and Jisoo's delivery. Upon release, the EP sold 385,501 in its first day in South Korea, breaking the record for the year's highest sales debut by a Korean soloist, and 523,318 copies in its first week. It debuted at number one on the Circle Album Chart, becoming Jisoo's second number-one album. The EP also charted in Croatia, Hungary, Japan, Portugal, Switzerland, and the US Top Album Sales chart. It has since been certified platinum by the Korea Music Content Association (KMCA) for selling 250,000 copies.

The lead single "Earthquake" was released alongside the album. The song debuted atop the US Billboard World Digital Songs chart and peaked within the top 50 of the Billboard Global 200 and South Korea's Circle Digital Chart. In promotion of the EP, Jisoo held the fanmeet "Soo in Love" in Seoul and embarked on the fanmeet tour Lights, Love, Action! in Asia.

== Background ==
Following the conclusion of Blackpink's Born Pink World Tour in 2023, Jisoo announced her departure from YG Entertainment for solo activities, establishing her own label named Blissoo in February 2024. In July of the same year, Jisoo revealed through her Bubble chat handle that she intended to work on more projects after filming for her acting roles concluded, sharing: "After filming is over, I will work hard to prepare so that I can meet Blinks again soon." In October, she further teased several songs that she would be releasing as a soloist, as well as Blackpink's 2025 comeback, on the same platform. During a livestream in December, she confirmed that her album preparations were almost done and revealed that it would have more songs than her debut single album Me (2023), which consisted of two tracks. On January 28, 2025, Jisoo announced that she had signed a global label deal with Warner Records for her solo music.

== Composition ==
Described as her "most comprehensive solo work yet", Amortage is said to mark the "rebirth of the global superstar". The EP features two Korean and two English songs and was described as "euphoric bubblegum pop" falling between Kylie Minogue and Carly Rae Jepsen. When creating the project, Jisoo stated she wanted to showcase "something dreamy yet pop-inspired" and selected music that created "synergy with the overall presentation" including the image, choreography, outfits, and concept. She decided to record "Your Love" and "Hugs & Kisses" in English as she thought their lyrics were "well-crafted to capture the mood of those songs" in that language and she "didn't want to break that atmosphere". The EP's title is a portmanteau of the words "amor", the Latin word for "love", and "montage", reflecting the record's themes of "the emotional stages of love and the defining moments of a relationship". Jisoo described it as a "collection of stories about love – the highs, the lows and everything in between." She co-wrote all four tracks on the EP alongside Jordan Roman and Jack Brady of The Wavys, and several collaborators, while Blissoo and The Wavys produced all the songs.

== Promotion and release ==
On January 13, 2025, Jisoo began teasing a mystery project with a teaser video released on her social media accounts. In the six-second clip, a lie detector needle is shown scratching wavelength patterns onto graph paper, followed by an end screen with the date February 14. A subsequent post on January 22 teased the project's title in a poster featuring the words "Amor Montage", which was also captioned: "A montage of love". On January 26, she confirmed that her debut extended play Amortage would be released on Valentine's Day. The reveal was accompanied by a roll-out schedule leading up to the EP's release. Following the announcement of her signing with Warner Records on January 28, it was confirmed that Amortage would be released through the label. The title poster was released on January 31 and two album covers for purple and black versions on February 1 and 2, after which pre-orders opened on February 3. On February 4, Jisoo unveiled the EP's tracklist of four songs, including the lead single "Earthquake". She subsequently released concept posters for each of the four songs on the EP between February 4 and 7. On February 10, a track spoiler video was released on YouTube, which provided a preview of all four tracks. On the evening of the EP's release date, Jisoo held a two-session local fanmeet titled "Soo in Love" at the CGV Cheongdam CineCity in Gangnam. To further support the EP, she embarked on Lights, Love, Action!, a fanmeet tour spanning seven cities across Asia. In partnership with the Singapore Tourism Board, Jisoo released a special music video for the track "Your Love" featuring the wildlife park Rainforest Wild Asia on August 12.

== Critical reception ==
Professional ratings
Review scores
Source	Rating
NME	4/5 stars

Crystal Bell of NME scored Amortage four out of five stars, commending the record for its ability to highlight Jisoo's strengths, as well as its self-assured embrace of "pop's timeless pleasures", which she identified as "melody, emotion and a touch of mischief". Writing for Billboard, Jeff Benjamin praised the EP as a "body of work highlighting the star's strengths while pushing to new creative heights". He found that its concept of a montage of love allowed Jisoo to successfully "play around with a spectrum of sounds, sentiments and vocal stylings" and showcased an "increasingly more confident, globally focused superstar".

== Accolades ==
Awards and nominations for Amortage
Year	Organization	Award	Result	Ref.
2025	Asian Pop Music Awards	Best Producer (Note: Producers: Blissoo, The Wavys)	Nominated	
2025	Asian Pop Music Awards	People's Choice Award	Nominated	

== Commercial performance ==
In South Korea, Amortage debuted at number one on Hanteo's daily physical album chart with 385,501 copies on its first day. With this, Jisoo broke the record for the largest first-day sales debut for a Korean solo artist in 2025. It surpassed 523,318 sales in its first week and subsequently sold another 121,941 sales in its second week, claiming the top spot on Hanteo's weekly album chart for two consecutive weeks. Amortage debuted at number one on the Circle Album Chart with 194,000 copies sold, while the Kit version debuted at number 22 with 5,040 copies sold and the SMC version at number 24 with 4,900 copies sold. As of April, Amortage sold 462,057 copies on the chart, making Jisoo the top-selling female K-pop soloist in history with over 2 million cumulative solo album sales. In the United States, the EP debuted at number 11 on the Top Album Sales chart with just under 7,000 copies sold after the album's physical release in the country on March 14.

== Track listing ==
All tracks are produced by Blissoo and The Wavys.

Amortage track listing
No.	Title	Writer(s)	Length
1.	"Earthquake"	Jisoo; Jack Brady; Jordan Roman; Sarah Troy; Sara Boe	3:10
2.	"Your Love"	Jisoo; Brady; Roman; Violet Skies; Lilian Caputo; Jenna Raine	2:53
3.	"Tears"	Jisoo; Brady; Roman; Kristin Carpenter; Sophie Simmons	3:02
4.	"Hugs & Kisses"	Jisoo; Brady; Roman; Austin Wolfe; Chloe Copeloff	3:09
Total length:			12:14

Amortage digital store edition bonus track
No.	Title	Writer(s)	Length
5.	"Earthquake" (English version)	Jisoo; Brady; Roman; Troy; Boe	3:10
Total length:			15:24

Amortage digital Love, Jisoo edition bonus track
No.	Title	Writer(s)	Length
1.	"Intro from Jisoo" (voice note)		0:07
6.	"Earthquake" (Sam Feldt remix)	Jisoo; Brady; Roman; Troy; Boe	2:30
Total length:			14:51

== Personnel ==
Credits are adapted from the album liner notes.

- Jisoo – vocals, executive producer, songwriter (all tracks)
- Jack Brady – executive producer, songwriter, recording engineer (all tracks); background vocals (track 2),
- Jordan Roman – executive producer, songwriter (all tracks); background vocals (track 2)
- Sarah Troy – songwriter, background vocals (track 1)
- Sara Boe – songwriter (track 1)
- Violet Skies – songwriter, background vocals (track 2)
- Lilian Caputo – songwriter, background vocals (2)
- Jenna Raine – songwriter, background vocals (2)
- Kristin Carpenter – songwriter (track 3)
- Sophie Simmons – songwriter (track 3)
- Austin Wolfe – songwriter (track 4)
- Chloe Copeloff – songwriter (track 4)
- Blissoo – producer (all tracks)
- The Wavys – producer (all tracks)
- Manny Marroquin – mix engineer
- Zach Pereyra – assistant mix engineer
- Anthony Vilchis – assistant mix engineer
- Trey Station – assistant mix engineer
- Chris Gehringer – mastering engineer

== Charts ==
=== Weekly charts ===
Weekly chart performance for Amortage
Chart (2025)	Peak position
Croatian International Albums (HDU)	4
Greek Albums (IFPI)	12
Hungarian Physical Albums (MAHASZ)	39
Japanese Albums (Oricon)	50
Japanese Digital Albums (Oricon)	19
Japanese Download Albums (Billboard Japan)	14
Portuguese Albums (AFP)	160
South Korean Albums (Circle)	1
South Korean Albums (Circle) Kit version	2
South Korean Albums (Circle) SMC version	8
South Korean Albums (Circle) Pink LP version	20
South Korean Albums (Circle) Heart LP version	16
Swiss Albums (Schweizer Hitparade)	86
US Top Album Sales (Billboard)	11

=== Monthly charts ===
Monthly chart performance for Amortage
Chart (2025)	Position
South Korean Albums (Circle)	7
South Korean Albums (Circle) Kit version	19
South Korean Albums (Circle) SMC version	22
South Korean Albums (Circle) Pink LP version	65
South Korean Albums (Circle) Heart LP version	48

=== Year-end charts ===
Year-end chart performance for Amortage
Chart (2025)	Position
South Korean Albums (Circle)	51

== Certifications and sales ==
Certifications and sales for Amortage
Region	Certification	Certified units/sales
Japan	—	898
South Korea (KMCA)	Platinum	630,460
United States	—	7,000

== Release history ==
Release dates and formats for Amortage
Region	Date	Format	Label	Ref.
Various	February 14, 2025	Digital download; streaming	Blissoo; Warner	
Hong Kong	February 14, 2025	Digital download; streaming	Blissoo; Empire	
South Korea	February 14, 2025	CD; Kit; NFC	Blissoo; Warner	
United States	March 14, 2025	CD; Kit; NFC	Blissoo; Warner	
Canada	March 14, 2025	CD; Kit; NFC	Blissoo; Warner	
Europe	March 14, 2025	CD; Kit; NFC	Blissoo; Warner	
South Korea	May 30, 2025	Vinyl LP	Blissoo; Warner	

== See also ==
- List of certified albums in South Korea
- List of Circle Album Chart number ones of 2025
- List of K-pop albums on the Billboard charts
