= So You Think You Can Dance: The Next Generation (American TV series) =

- Hosted by: Cat Deeley
- Judges: Nigel Lythgoe; Paula Abdul; Jason Derulo; Maddie Ziegler
- Winner: Leon "Kida" Burns
- Runner-up: J.T. Church

Release
- Original network: Fox
- Original release: May 30 – September 12, 2016

Season chronology
- ← Previous; Season 12 Next → Season 14

So You Think You Can Dance: The Next Generation is the 13th season of So You Think You Can Dance, an American dance competition show. The show premiered on May 30, 2016, in a new format featuring contestants between ages 8 to 13 at the time of their auditions. The season was broadcast on Fox in the United States, one show each week on Mondays, as it was the previous season. The top prize remained $250,000, and Cat Deeley continued as host.

Auditions were held in Los Angeles, CA, Chicago, IL and New York City. 100 contestants were selected by the judges for the Dance Academy portion of the season, in which 10 contestants were selected by, and paired with, "all-stars" from previous seasons, who mentored and performed with them during the live performance episodes.

== Judges ==
Series creator and executive producer Nigel Lythgoe, along with new permanent members Paula Abdul and Jason Derulo, returned as members of the permanent judging panel and judge the audition rounds. After this, the fourth judge, dancer Maddie Ziegler, who was then 13 years old, joined the show.

== Format ==
Season 13 featured a significant shift in format in that the contestants were all between the ages of 8 and 13 at the time of their auditions. Approximately 100 dancers were selected from the auditions for the next segment of the season, the Dance Academy. From these, the top 50 were chosen, and finally the top 10 were selected as contestants by a So You Think You Can Dance "all-star" who provided mentorship during the live shows and participated as a duet partner with his or her contestant in performances.

== Auditions ==
Open auditions for season 13 were held in three cities beginning in February 2016.

Air Date	Audition Venue	City	Audition Date
May 30, 2016	Orpheum Theatre	Los Angeles, CA	February 27, 2016
June 6, 2016	Lou Conte Dance Studio	Chicago, IL	March 11, 2016
June 13, 2016	Broadway Dance Center	New York City	March 18, 2016

During the audition round, the judges interviewed each audition contestant, watched a brief audition and gave feedback, while the audition contestant's family sat at the side of the stage and often participated in the interviews. Offstage, Cat Deeley chatted with contestants and judges. Approximately 100 contestant were sent through to the academy.

== Dance Academy ==
Dance Academy week was split among two episodes. The June 20 episode covered the first day of the academy. The first task for the 10 all-stars was to watch solo dances by each of the contestants were sent through from the auditions. From these, each all-star selected five contestants (three from their own dance style and two wildcards), from the large number of audition contestants, to join their "team". If a contestant was selected by more than one all-star, he or she could choose which all-star's team to join. Choreographer Warren Carlyle and the all-stars then taught the 50 remaining contestants a Broadway couples dance routine in 90 minutes, and contestants from each team were paired with contestants from another team. After all of the couples danced, each all-star was required to cut one contestants from his or her team, either gender, leaving a total of 40 contestants. Throughout the episode, Maddie Ziegler and Cat Deeley interviewed successful competitors.

The June 27 episode covered days two and three of academy week. On day two, the all-stars each narrowed down their teams to three and then two contestants, based first on a hip-hop routine for pairs choreographed by Tabitha and Napoleon D'umo, and then on a contemporary routine, created by Travis Wall, danced simultaneously by the remaining three members of each team. On the last day, the last two contestants from each team danced a solo just for their own all-star. Each all-star then selected one contestant, making a total of 10 contestants that he or she will mentor through the finals round. The all-stars and their contestants are:

Contemporary

- Kathryn McCormick: season 6, 3rd place – Tate
- Robert Roldan: season 7, 3rd place – J. T.
- Sasha Mallory: season 8 runner-up – Jordan

Ballroom

- Jenna Johnson: season 10, top 8 – Jake
- Paul Karmiryan, season 10, top 6 – Ruby
- Jonathan Platero, season 5, top 16 – Daniela

Tap

- Gaby Diaz, season 12 winner – Emma

Hip-Hop

- Marko Germar°, season 8, top 3 (replacing Joshua Allen) – Sheaden
- Comfort Fedoke, season 4, top 8 – Tahani
- Du-Shaunt "Fik-Shun" Stegall, season 10 winner – Kida

°Although Marko competed in season 8 as a contemporary/jazz contestant, he stepped in, before the first live show, to mentor hip-hop contestant Sheaden after Joshua withdrew from the show.

== Studio Shows ==
=== Top 10 Contestants ===
Contestant	Age	Home town	Dance style	All-star mentor	Placement
Leon "Kida" Burns	14	Sacramento, California	Hip Hop	Du-Shaunt "Fik-Shun" Stegall	First
J.T. Church	10	Haymarket, Virginia	Jazz	Robert Roldan	Second
Tate McRae	13	Calgary, Alberta, Canada	Contemporary/Ballet	Kathryn McCormick	Third
Emma Hellenkamp	11	San Diego, California	Tap	Gaby Diaz	Fourth
Tahani Anderson	13	Victorville, California	Hip Hop	Comfort Fedoke	Fifth
Ruby Castro	12	Miami, Florida	Ballroom	Paul Karmiryan	Sixth
Jake Monreal	12	Miami, Florida	Ballroom	Jenna Johnson	Seventh
Jordan Nata'e Wandick	14	Bakersfield, California	Contemporary/Jazz	Sasha Mallory	Seventh
Sheaden Gabriel	12	Murrieta, California	Hip Hop	Marko Germar	Ninth
Daniela Avanzini	11	Atlanta, Georgia	Ballroom	Jonathan Platero	Tenth

==== Elimination chart ====
Legend
Female	Male	Bottom 2 contestants	Eliminated

Result show date:	7/18	7/25	8/1	8/22	8/29	9/12
Contestant	Results					
Leon "Kida" Burns						Winner
J.T. Church						Runner-Up
Tate McRae						3rd Place
Emma Hellenkamp						4th Place
Tahani Anderson			Btm 2	Btm 2	Elim	
Ruby Castro		Btm 2		Elim		
Jake Monreal			Elim			
Jordan Nata'e Wandick			Elim			
Sheaden Gabriel	Btm 2	Elim				
Daniela Avanzini	Elim					

=== Performances ===
==== Showcase (July 11, 2016) ====
The live shows were all two-hour broadcasts. The first live show, on July 11, 2016, opened with a group dance by all ten contestants dancing with their all-stars and all together, futuristically dressed in white. In the middle of the show there was a contemporary group dance by the all-stars, and the show ended with a group hip-hop dance by all of the top-ten contestants. During the show, each contestant performed one solo and one duet with his or her all-star; both dances were in the contestant's primary dance style. At the beginning of the show, host Cat Deeley announced that all-star Joshua Allen has been replaced by Marko Germar, to mentor and pair with hip-hop contestant Sheaden Gabriel. Maddie Ziegler observed the contestants' rehearsals and joined the judging panel, during the broadcast, giving the contestants "relatable feedback" and offering encouraging words about their performances.

Contestants	Style	Music	Choreographer(s)
Top 10 and all-stars	Multiple styles	"Prodigy"—Nathan Lanier	Christopher Scott
Leon "Kida" Burns; Du-Shaunt "Fik-Shun" Stegall	Hip-hop	"Winning"—Fingazz	Christopher Scott
Tate McRae; Kathryn McCormick	Contemporary	"Goldenheart"—Dawn Richard	Tyce Diorio
Jake Monreal; Jenna Johnson	Cha-cha-cha	"Toca Toca Radio Edit"—Fly Project	Jean-Marc Généreux
Sheaden Gabriel; Marko Germar	Hip hop	"Why I'm Here (Original Mix)"—Statik Link feat. Young Live	Christopher "Pharside" Jennings; Krystal "Phoenix" Meraz
Jordan Nata'e Wandick; Sasha Mallory	Contemporary	"The Light That Never Fails"—Andra Day	Brian Friedman
Emma Hellenkamp; Gaby Diaz	Tap	"Watch Me Do"—Meghan Trainor	Anthony Morigerato
Ruby Castro; Paul Karmiryan	Cha-cha-cha	"How Deep Is Your Love"—Calvin Harris & Disciples	Jean-Marc Généreux
Tahani Anderson; Comfort Fedoke	Hip-hop	"Cut It"—O.T. Genasis feat. Young Dolph	Luther Brown
Daniela Avanzini; Jonathan Platero	Salsa	"Latinos"—Proyecto Uno	Oksana Platero
J. T. Church; Robert Roldan	Contemporary	"Stand in the Light"—Jordan Smith	Mandy Moore
All-stars	Contemporary	"Unsteady (Erich Lee Gravity Remix)"—X Ambassadors	Mandy Moore
Top 10	Hip-hop	"Move (If You Wanna)"—MIMS	Willdabeast; Janelle Ginestra

- Top 10 contestant's solos:

Contestant	Style	Music
Emma Hellenkamp	Tap	"Impossible"—Lion Babe
Tahani Anderson	Hip-hop	"Anyway"—Chris Brown feat. Tayla Parx
J. T. Church	Jazz	”Dance with Me Tonight”—Olly Murs
Ruby Castro	Paso Doble	"Unstoppable”—E.S. Posthumus
Daniela Avanzini	Jive	”Proud Mary”—Tina Turner
Leon "Kida" Burns	Hip-hop	"Ants"—edIT
Jordan Nata'e Wandick	Contemporary	"Freedom"—Anthony Hamilton & Elayna Boynton
Tate McRae	Contemporary	"The Beginning"—Factor Eight
Sheaden Gabriel	Hip-hop	"Look at Me Now"—Chris Brown feat. Lil Wayne & Busta Rhymes
Jake Monreal	Cha-cha-cha	"I Like It Like That"—Tito Nieves

==== Week 1 (July 18, 2016) ====
Derulo was unavailable this week, but all-star Stephen "tWitch" Boss took his place at the judging table; Ziegler continued to attend and comment at the contestants' rehearsals. The show opened with a group Bollywood-style number danced by all of the contestants and all-stars. In the middle of the show, the all-stars performed a piece inspired by Romeo and Juliet. Contestants were paired with each other to dance two routines; each contestant performed at least one routine outside of his or her primary style. The kids also performed duets with their all-stars. Daniela and her pair Sheaden were ranked in the bottom two, based on the previous week's voting, and Daniela was eliminated.

Contestant	Style	Music	Choreographer(s)	Result
Contestants and all-stars	Bollywood	"Let's Nacho"—Kapoor & Sons (Since 1921) soundtrack	Nakul Dev Mahajan	N/A
Jordan Nata'e Wandick; Ruby Castro	African jazz	"Breath Connect Us All"—Professor Trance & The Energizers	Sean Cheesman	Safe
J. T. Church; Emma Hellenkamp	Hip hop	"Dessert (Remix)"—Dawin featuring Silentó	Tabitha and Napoleon D'umo	Safe
Tahani Anderson; Jake Monreal	Contemporary	"Tell Your Heart to Beat Again"—Danny Gokey	Bonnie Story	Safe
Daniela Avanzini; Sheaden Gabriel	Cha-cha-cha	"I Love It"—Icona Pop featuring Charli XCX	Umario Diallo	Bottom 2 Daniela eliminated
Leon "Kida" Burns; Tate McRae	Hip hop	"Manolo"—Trip Lee featuring Lecrae	Tabitha and Napoleon D'umo	Safe
All-stars	Contemporary	"Move Your Body"—Sia	Nick Florez and RJ Durell	N/A
J. T. Church; Emma Hellenkamp	Broadway	"The Jet Song"— from West Side Story; Dave Grusin	Spencer Liff	Safe
Jordan Nata'e Wandick; Ruby Castro	Contemporary	"My Own"—Whitaker	Dee Caspary	Safe
Leon "Kida" Burns; Tate McRae	Jazz	"I Do What I Love"—Ellie Goulding	Nick Florez and RJ Durell	Safe
Daniela Avanzini; Sheaden Gabriel	Broadway	"Rich Man's Frug"— from Sweet Charity	Spencer Liff	Bottom 2 Daniela eliminated
Tahani Anderson; Jake Monreal	Jive	"Jailhouse Rock"—J-Lew and the Crew	Emma Slater and Sasha Farber	Safe

- Duets choreographed by all-stars:

Contestant	Style	Music
Sheaden and Marko	Hip hop	"Treasure"—Bruno Mars
Tate and Kathryn	Contemporary	"Don't Panic"—Clairity
Kida and Fik-Shun	Hip-hop	"TRNSTTR (Lucian Remix)"—Black Coast featuring M. Maggie
Ruby and Paul	Ballroom	"Muchacho"—Jonny Good
Jordan and Sasha	Contemporary	"Pure4Sure"—Sunless '97
Emma and Gaby	Tap	"Boogie Shoes"—KC and the Sunshine Band
Jake and Jenna	Ballroom	"Ain't Your Mama"—Jennifer Lopez
Tahani and Comfort	Hip-hop	"Pep Rally"—Missy Elliott
Daniela and Jonathan	Ballroom	"Marchina (Remix 14)"—DJ DLVG
J. T. and Robert	Contemporary	"Change is Everything"—Son Lux

==== Week 2 (July 25, 2016) ====
The show began again with a dance that included all the contestants and all-stars. During the course of the broadcast, there was also a group number for the kids and later one for the all-stars. The top nine contestants performed full-length routines with their all-stars in their own primary styles (or similar styles), and each did a short solo in his or her primary style. The kids each gave a campaign speech as if they were running for US president. Tate McRae, who is Canadian, quipped in her speech: "The only wall that should be shared between Canada and the United States should be Travis Wall." Sheaden was eliminated, based on the previous week's voting. The show has been promoting the sixth annual National Dance Day, "an annual celebration that encourages Americans to embrace dance as a fun and positive way to maintain good health and combat obesity", which is scheduled to take place on Saturday, July 30, 2016.

Contestants	Style	Music	Choreographer(s)	Result
Contestants and all-stars	Pop Jazz	"Me Too"—Meghan Trainor	Brian Friedman	N/A
Jake and Jenna	Samba	"Hip Hip Chin Chin" (Maxim Illion Mix)—Club des Belugas	Dmitry Chaplin and Jenya Shatilova	Safe
Kida and Fik-Shun	Hip-hop	"Panda"—Desiigner	Dave Scott	Safe
Tate and Kathryn	Contemporary	"Get Here"—Brenda Russell (Oleta Adams cover)	Brian Friedman	Safe
Jordan and Sasha	Jazz	"Sax"—Fleur East	Ray Leeper	Safe
Sheaden and Marko	Hip-hop	"Down in the DM"—Yo Gotti	Luther Brown	Eliminated
Ruby and Paul	Argentine Tango	"Malevo"—Electro Dub Tango	Miriam Larici and Leonardo Barrionuevo	Bottom 2
Tahani and Comfort	Dancehall	"Get Busy"—Sean Paul	Laure Courtellemont	Safe
J. T. and Robert	Contemporary	"The Mirror"—Alexandre Desplat	Travis Wall	Safe
Emma and Gaby	Tap	"Salute"—Little Mix	Chloe Arnold	Safe
Contestants	Contemporary	"Wolf"—Tailor	Jaci Royal	N/A
All-stars	Contemporary	"Send in the Clowns"—from A Little Night Music (Sarah Vaughan and the Count Basie Orchestra)	Travis Wall	N/A

- Top 9 contestant's solos:

Contestant	Style	Music
Tahani	Hip-hop	"Run the World (Girls)"—Beyoncé
Sheaden	Hip-hop	"Lean On"—Major Lazer featuring MØ and DJ Snake
Ruby	Samba	"The Girl's Gone Wild"—Travis Tritt
J. T.	Jazz	"Unsteady (Erich Lee Gravity Remix)"—X Ambassadors
Tate	Contemporary	"Lorikeet"—Ship Shape
Emma	Tap	"Expensive"—Tori Kelly featuring Daye Jack
Jordan	Contemporary	"Confident"—Demi Lovato
Jake	Cha Cha Cha	"It's a Man's Man's Man's World"—Seal
Kida	Hip-hop	"Lazarus"—Trip Lee featuring Thi'si

==== Week 3 (August 1, 2016) ====
The show began with a group toy-themed hip-hop routine for all of the contestants and all-stars. Later, all 10 all-stars danced a contemporary routine based on a snow-globe. Each of the contestants danced a routine in their primary style with their all-star and then paired with another contestant for a routine in a new genre. Jake and Jordan were eliminated, based on the previous week's voting.

Contestants	Style	Music	Choreographer(s)	Result
Contestants and all-stars	Hip-hop	"Ain't Playing With Ya"—District 78	Pharside Jennings & Phoenix Meraz	N/A
Emma and Gaby	Tap	"Walk Like an Egyptian"—The Bangles (The Puppini Sisters cover)	Anthony Morigerato	Safe
Tahani and Comfort	Lyrical hip-hop	"I'm Going Down"—Rose Royce	Tabitha and Napoleon D'umo	Safe
Ruby and Paul	Pasodoble	"Echelon"—Jack Trammell	Jean Marc Genereux	Safe
Jordan and Sasha	Contemporary	"Amazing Grace (Premier Video Appearance)"—Harlem Gospel Choir	Sean Cheesman	Eliminated
Jake and Jenna	Jive	"Land of 1000 Dances"—Chris Kenner (Wilson Pickett cover)	Jean Marc Genereux	Eliminated
J. T. and Robert	Jazz	"Friend Like Me"—from Aladdin (Ne-Yo cover)	Mandy Moore	Safe
Kida and Fik-Shun	Hip-hop	"The Buzz"—Hermitude featuring Big K.R.I.T., Mataya & Young Tapz	Misha Gabriel	Safe
Tate and Kathryn	Contemporary	"She Used to Be Mine"—Sara Bareilles	Travis Wall	Safe
All-stars	Contemporary	"A Star in a Stoneboat"— Kevin Keller Trio	Tyce Diorio	N/A

- Contestant duets

Contestants	Style	Music	Choreographer(s)
Jordan and Jake	Hip-hop	"Bad Man"—Missy Elliott featuring Vybz Kartel & M.I.A.	Pharside Jennings & Phoenix Meraz
Tahani and J. T.	Cha-cha-cha	"Bom Bom" (Radio Edit)—Sam and the Womp	Emma Slater and Sasha Farber
Emma and Tate	Broadway	"Act One: Trouble"—from Smokey Joe's Cafe: The Songs of Leiber and Stoller	Sean Cheesman
Ruby and Kida	Contemporary	"Over the Rainbow"—from The Wizard of Oz (Shawn McDonald cover)	Mandy Moore

==== Week 4: Quarter-Finals (August 22, 2016) ====
The show began with a group contemporary routine for all of the contestants and all-stars. Later, four of the female all-stars danced a contemporary routine, and Comfort and the five male all-stars danced a hip-hop number. Each of the contestants danced a routine in their primary style with their all-star, paired with another contestant for a routine in a new genre, and also performed a short solo dance in their own genre. Ruby was eliminated, based on the previous week's voting.

Contestants	Style	Music	Choreographer(s)	Result
Contestants and all-stars	Contemporary	"What the World Needs Now is Love"—Hal David and Burt Bacharach (Will Young cover)	Travis Wall	N/A
Kida and Fik-Shun	Hip-hop	"Blow a Check"—Zoey Dollaz	Luther Brown	Safe
Tate and Kathryn	Contemporary	"Rise Up"—Andra Day	Mandy Moore	Safe
Ruby and Paul	Jive	"Rip It Up"—Little Richard	Mark Ballas	Eliminated
Emma and Gaby	Tap	"We Will Rock You"—Queen	Nick Young	Safe
J. T. and Robert	Broadway	"Mr. Bojangles"—Jerry Jeff Walker (Robbie Williams cover)	Al Blackstone	Safe
Tahani and Comfort	Hip-hop	"BANJI"—Sharaya J	Jamal Sims	Safe
Four all-star women	Contemporary	"This Is Not the End"—Clare Maguire	Mandy Moore	N/A
All-star men and Comfort	Hip-hop	"Dangerous"—Busta Rhymes	Luther Brown	N/A

- Contestant duets

Contestants	Style	Music	Choreographer(s)
Emma and J. T.	Contemporary	"I Will Not Forget You"—Max Richter	Travis Wall
Kida and Tate	Pasodoble	"Diablo Rojo"—Rodrigo y Gabriela	Mark Ballas
Ruby and Tahani	Broadway	"Stand By Me"—Ben E. King (Joseph Leo Bwarie cover)	Al Blackstone

- Top 6 contestant's solos:

Contestant	Style	Music
Ruby	Tango	"Libertango"—Astor Piazzolla
Tahani	Hip-hop	"Bring Em Out"—T.I.
Tate	Contemporary	"Trophy"—NAO featuring A. K. Paul
J. T.	Jazz	"Feeling Good"—from The Roar of the Greasepaint – The Smell of the Crowd (Michael Bublé cover)
Emma	Tap	"Foc"—Rodrigo y Gabriela
Kida	Hip-hop	"Boogie Bruthas"—Fingazz

==== Week 5: Semi-Finals (August 29, 2016) ====
The show began with a group routine for all of the contestants and all-stars. Each of the contestants then danced with his or her all-star in their primary style. Two groups of all-stars danced separately: first a contemporary routine and then a Broadway number. In the second half of the show, the contestants each choreographed a duet with his or her all-star in their own genre, choosing the concept, music, costumes and make-up. Finally, judge Maddie Ziegler performed a dramatic contemporary routine paired with choreographer Travis Wall. Tahani was eliminated based on the previous week's voting.

Contestants	Style	Music	Choreographer(s)	Result
Contestants and all-stars	Contemporary	"I Miss You"—Bjork	Nick Florez and RJ Durell	N/A
Tate and Kathryn	Contemporary	"This Gift"—Glen Hansard	Stacey Tookey	Safe
Kida and Fik-Shun	Hip-hop; Krump	"All the Way Up"—Fat Joe and Remy Ma featuring French Montana and Infared	Pharside and Phoenix	Safe
Emma and Gaby	Tap	"On the Sunny Side of the Street"—Jimmy McHugh and Dorothy Fields (Ella Fitzgerald and Count Basie version)	Savion Glover	Safe
J. T. and Robert	Contemporary	"I'll Keep You Safe"—Sleeping at Last	Stacey Tookey	Safe
Tahani and Comfort	Hip-hop	"WTF (Where They From)"—Missy Elliott featuring Pharrell Williams	Dave Scott	Eliminated
Five all-stars: Jenna, Sasha, Kathryn, Marko and Paul	Contemporary	"Feel Again"—OneRepublic	Theresa Stone	N/A
The other five all-stars: Gaby, Comfort, Fik-Shun, Robert and Jonathan	Broadway	"The Way You Look Tonight"—Jerome Kern and Dorothy Fields, from the film Swing Time (Maroon 5 cover)	Al Blackstone	N/A
Maddie Ziegler and Travis Wall	Contemporary	"Cage of Bones"—Son Lux	Travis Wall	N/A

- Duets choreographed by the contestants

Contestants	Style	Music	Concept
Tate and Kathryn	Contemporary	"Footprints"—Jeff Grace	Unmasked: Remove your mask to show your imperfections/true self
Kida and Fik-shun	Hip-hop	"I Can Make Ya"—Fingazz	Manipulator: Robot Kida teaches robot Fik-shun to loosen up
J. T. and Robert	Contemporary	"Count on Me"—Bruno Mars	Friendship: Friends can always count on each other
Tahani and Comfort	Hip-hop	"No Flex Zone"—Rae Sremmurd	No Flex Zone: Cool Tahani schools nerdy Comfort
Emma and Gaby	Tap	"Rather Be"—Clean Bandit (Pentatonix cover)	Here With You: Two friends who would rather be together than anywhere else

==== Week 6: Finale Performance (September 5, 2016) ====
The top four competed on Labor Day. Audience voting after this show was combined with the votes from the August 29 show to determine the results of the season, so there was no elimination this week. The show again opened with a group number for the remaining contestants and the all-stars. The top four contestants danced another routine, and later so did the all-stars. Each contestant performed a duet with an all-star who was not his or her mentor, in a new genre, and each also danced a solo in his or her own genre. Finally, the contestants each reprised their favorite routine of the season with their usual all-stars.

Contestants	Style	Music	Choreographer(s)
Contestants and all-stars		"You Don't Own Me"—Lesley Gore (Son Lux featuring Hanna Benn cover)	Travis Wall
Top 4 contestants	Broadway	"Ease On down the Road"—Charlie Smalls (Diana Ross and Michael Jackson in The Wiz)	Tabitha and Napoleon D'umo
Kida and Sasha	African Jazz	"Din Daa Daa" (Radio Edit)—George Kranz (Kevin Aviance cover)	Sean Cheesman
Tate and Jonathan	Salsa	"Robi-Rob's Boriqua Anthem"—C + C Music Factory featuring El General	Stephanie Stevenson
Emma and Jenna	Contemporary	"How Long Will I Love You?"—Mike Scott (Ellie Goulding cover)	Jaci Royal
J. T. and Marko	Bollywood	"Malhari"—Bajirao Mastani soundtrack	Nakul Dev Mahajan
Tate and Kathryn	Contemporary	"She Used to Be Mine"—Sara Bareilles	Travis Wall
All-stars, excluding Sasha	Jazz	"Feathery"—Milky Chance	Mandy Korpinen and Elizabeth Petrin
Kida and Fik-Shun	Hip-hop	"Winning"—Fingazz	Christopher Scott
J. T. and Robert	Contemporary	"The Mirror"—Alexandre Desplat	Travis Wall
Emma and Gaby	Tap	"Walk Like an Egyptian"—The Bangles (The Puppini Sisters cover)	Anthony Morigerato

- Top 4 contestant's solos:

Contestant	Style	Music
Emma	Tap	"Someone Who Can Dance"—Icona Pop
J. T.	Jazz	"Ghost of Sky" (Epic Dub)—Steed Lord
Tate	Contemporary	"Easy" (Switch Screens)—Son Lux featuring Lorde
Kida	Hip-hop	"Earned It" (Marian Hill Remix)—The Weeknd

==== Week 7: Finale Results (September 12, 2016) ====
The episode began with a group dance for all the contestants and all-stars that began with the Top 4 contestants waking up and getting ready for the big day. There were also new group dances for the hip-hop contestants and their all-stars; the ballroom contestants and their all-stars; and the contemporary contestants (plus Emma) and their all stars. In addition, there was a new group routine for all the contestants plus Maddie Ziegler, and Cat Deely chose to reprise her favorite all-stars routine. During the course of the broadcast, each of the Top 4 reprised their favorite solo of the season, each judge chose two favorite routines to see again, each of the all-stars chose a favorite duet to reprise, and other duets were reprised as described below. Results were announced during the last hour of the show as follows: Emma placed 4th, Tate was 3rd, J. T. was runner-up, and Kida was 1st, won the $250,000 top prize and will be featured on the cover of Dance Spirit magazine, it was the first season that the top four were never in the danger zone, with seven contestants who were never in the bottom two contestants, which became the thirty-first contestants in the show's run never to face elimination from being among the bottom twi contestants and it became the twenty-third contestants to be in the grand finale.

Contestants	Style	Music	Choreographer(s)
Top 4 contestants, joined by Top 10 and all-stars	Hip-hop	"Brand New"—Ben Rector	Christopher Scott and Jamal Sims
Kida and Fik-shun	Hip-hop	"I Can Make Ya"—Fingazz	Kida (Nigel's pick)
Sheaden and Marko	Hip hop	"Treasure (Bruno Mars song)"—Bruno Mars	
Tate and Jonathan	Salsa	"Robi-Rob's Boriqua Anthem"—C + C Music Factory featuring El General	Stephanie Stevenson (Maddie's pick)
Jordan and Sasha	Contemporary	"The Light That Never Fails"—Andra Day	Brian Friedman (Paula's pick)
Jake and Jenna	Ballroom	"Ain't Your Mama"—Jennifer Lopez	
Emma and Gaby	Tap	"Salute"—Little Mix	Chloe Arnold (Jason's pick)
Kida, Fik-Shun, Sheaden, Marko, Tahani and Comfort	Hip-hop	"Ain't No Time"—Future	Luther Brown
Tate and Kathryn	Contemporary	"This Gift"—Glen Hansard	Stacey Tookey (Kathryn's pick)
Top 10 and Maddie	Contemporary	"Small"—Lamb	Mandy Moore
J. T. and Robert	Broadway	"Mr. Bojangles"—Jerry Jeff Walker (Robbie Williams cover)	Al Blackstone (Nigel's pick)
Jake, Jenna, Ruby, Paul, Daniela and Jonathan	Ballroom	"A Little Party Never Killed Nobody (All We Got)"—Fergie, Q-Tip and GoonRock	Dmitry Chaplin and Jenya Shatilova
Tahani and Comfort	Hip-hop	"Pep Rally"—Missy Elliott	
Special performance by Sergei Polunin	Ballet	"Diane et Actéon"—Cesare Pugni from La Esmeralda	Sergei Polunin
Ruby and Paul	Argentine Tango	"Malevo"—Electro Dub Tango	Miriam Larici and Leonardo Barrionuevo (Paula's pick)
All-stars, excluding Sasha	Jazz	"Feathery"—Milky Chance	Mandy Korpinen and Elizabeth Petrin (Cat's pick)
Kida and Fik-Shun	Hip-hop	"The Buzz"—Hermitude featuring Big K.R.I.T., Mataya & Young Tapz	Misha Gabriel (Fik-Shun's pick)
Tate, Kathryn, Sasha, Jordan, J. T., Robert, Emma and Gaby	Contemporary	"Burgs"—Mt. Wolf	Travis Wall
Daniela and Jonathan	Ballroom	"Marchina (Remix 14)"—DJ DLVG	
Ruby and Paul	Ballroom	"Muchacho"—Jonny Good	
Tahani and Comfort	Lyrical hip-hop	"I'm Going Down"—Rose Royce	Tabitha and Napoleon D'umo (Jason's pick)
Emma and Gaby	Tap	"We Will Rock You"—Queen	Nick Young (Gaby's pick)
Kida and Tate	Hip hop	"Manolo"—Trip Lee featuring Lecrae	Tabitha and Napoleon D'umo (Maddie's pick)
J. T. and Robert	Contemporary	"Stand in the Light"—Jordan Smith	Mandy Moore (Robert's pick)

- Top 4 contestants' solos (contestants' choice):

Contestant	Style	Music
J. T.	Jazz	"Feeling Good"—from The Roar of the Greasepaint – The Smell of the Crowd (Michael Bublé cover)
Tate	Contemporary	"Trophy"—NAO featuring A.K. Paul
Emma	Tap	"Expensive"—Tori Kelly featuring Daye Jack
Kida	Hip-hop	"Boogie Bruthas"—Fingazz

== Ratings ==
=== U.S. Nielsen ratings ===
Show	Episode	First air date	Rating (18–49)	Share (18–49)	Viewers (millions)	Rank (timeslot)	Rank (night)	Rank (week)
1	Auditions #1	May 30, 2016	1.0	4	3.75	3	3	
2	Auditions #2	June 6, 2016	1.0	4	4.08	3	3	
3	Auditions #3	June 13, 2016	0.9	3	3.52	3	6	
4	Academy #1	June 20, 2016	0.8	3	3.23	3 (tie)	4 (tie)	
5	Academy #2	June 27, 2016	0.9	4	3.04	3 (tie)	4 (tie)	
6	Top 10 Perform	July 11, 2016	0.7	3	2.89	4	5 (tie)	
7	Top 10 Perform + Elimination	July 18, 2016	0.7	3	2.66	3 (tie)	4 (tie)	
8	Top 9 Perform + Elimination	July 25, 2016	0.7	3	2.57	3 (tie)	5 (tie)	
9	Top 8 Perform + Elimination	August 1, 2016	0.7	3	2.68	4	6 (tie)	
10	Top 6 Perform + Elimination	August 22, 2016	0.7	2	2.62	4	6	
11	Top 5 Perform + Elimination	August 29, 2016	0.7	3	2.57	4	6 (tie)	
12	Final 4	September 5, 2016	0.5	2	2.37	4	8	
13	Season Finale	September 12, 2016	0.7	2	2.27	4	8	

Notes:

- July 4, 2016: broadcast was a rerun of academy #2.
- August 8, 2016: broadcast was a rerun of Top 9 Perform + Elimination.
- August 15, 2016: broadcast was a rerun of Top 8 Perform + Elimination.

== See also ==
- List of So You Think You Can Dance finalists
