= Tarzzan =

South Korean model, rapper, and dancer (born 2002)

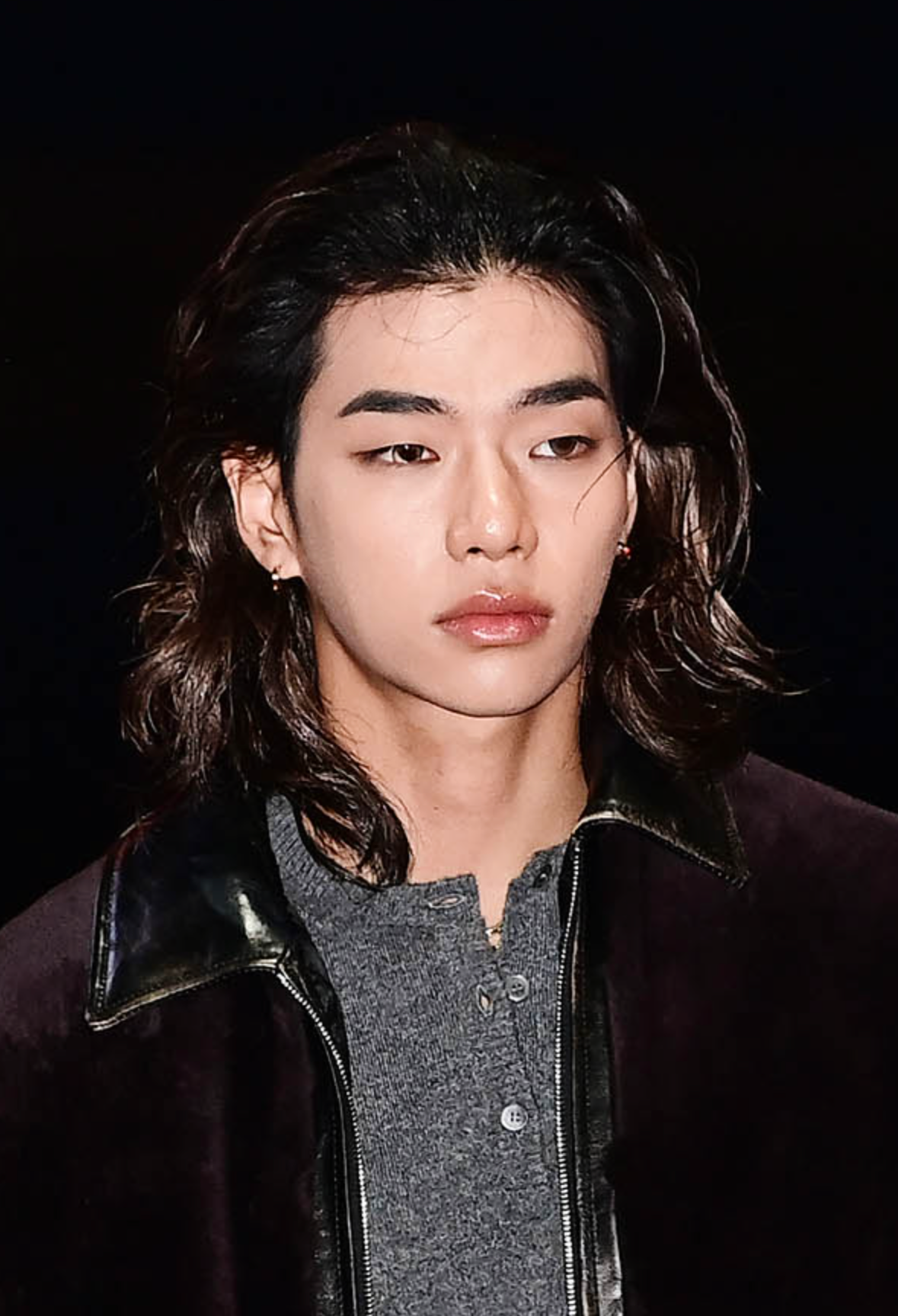
- Tarzzan in November 2025
- Born: Lee Chae-won; September 27, 2002 (age 24); Ulsan, South Korea
- Occupations: Model; rapper; dancer
- Years active: 2017–present
- Agent: KPlus
- Musical career
- Origin: Seoul, South Korea
- Genre: K-pop
- Instrument: Vocals
- Years active: 2025–present
- Label: The Black Label
- Member of: AllDay Project

Korean name
- Hangul: 이채원
- RR: I Chaewon
- MR: I Ch'aewŏn

Signature
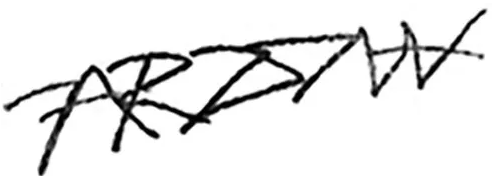

Lee Chae-won (Korean: 이채원; born September 27, 2002), also known as Tarzzan (타잔), is a South Korean model, rapper, and dancer. He first competed as a professional dancer at the Seoul International Dance Competition in 2017 and later became the first Korean male dancer to win consecutive gold medals at the 49th and 50th Dong‑A International Contemporary Dance Competition in 2019 and 2020. He debuted as a model at the 2022 F/W Seoul Fashion Week and is currently active as a member of AllDay Project, a co-ed group under The Black Label.

== Early life ==
Lee Chae-won was born on September 27, 2002, in Ulsan, South Korea. He attended elementary school in Arizona, United States; its only Asian student. Returning to South Korea, he auditioned for a role in Friend: The Great Legacy (2013), and trained as a triathlete before switching to contemporary dance at the suggestion of his cousin, a ballerina. He later attended Busan Arts High School, majoring in modern dance, and studied contemporary dance at the Korea National University of Arts.

== Career ==
=== 2017–2024: Career beginnings and modeling advancements ===
Lee first competed at the 14th Seoul International Dance Competition in 2017, placing first at age 13–14 (Korean age). He continued to gain recognition in national competitions, winning first place at the 2018 Korea International Contemporary Dance Competition and again at the 17th Seoul International Dance Competition. He became the first Korean male dancer to win gold medals for two consecutive years at the 49th and 50th Dong-A International Contemporary Dance Competition in 2019 and 2020; a prestigious distinction that also grants automatic admission to the Korea National University of Arts. He later competed internationally in the contemporary dance category at the 2021 TanzOlymp Asia Dance Competition, a competition often regarded as an Olympic‑level platform for dancers, where he received the grand prix, and the 2022 Berlin International Dance Competition, where he earned a gold medal.

In 2022, Lee received a gold medal at the Valentina Kozlova International Ballet Competition (VKIBC) in New York. He was subsequently invited by the Martha Graham School to participate in a three-week winter intensive course and by the New York Theatre Ballet for its choreography workshop. He also received a scholarship from the Alvin Ailey School, an opportunity that aligned with his goal of becoming the first Korean dancer to join the Alvin Ailey II Dance Company.

Lee signed with the modeling agency YG KPlus after being personally scouted by CEO Ko Eun-kyung. He received the offer while assisting a friend with choreography during her participation in a supermodel contest. Following his debut at the 2022 F/W Seoul Fashion Week, he gained early industry attention, including an exclusive magazine pictorial produced shortly after his debut. He became a steady fixture on the Seoul Fashion Week runway and expanded his work internationally through the 2024 Milan Fashion Week. His editorial presence spaned all fashion magazines in South Korea, including Esquire, Vogue, Dazed, and GQ, with additional features in Japanese publications such as Nylon. His portfolio also include campaigns for Samsung, McDonald's, Musinsa, Caribbean Bay, and LG U+, and has attracted interest from several luxury houses, receiving offers from Bottega Veneta, Fendi, and Dior.

=== 2025–present: Debut with AllDay Project ===
In 2023, Lee met singer Bryan Chase at a launch party while working as a model. Through Chase, he was introduced to Teddy Park, co-founder of The Black Label, to discuss a potential opportunity with the agency. Lee was subsequently scouted and selected for the label’s next prospective act, becoming one of its first confirmed members alongside Annie Moon. He was introduced as a member of AllDay Project, a co-ed group under Park's label, on June 9, 2025, and debuted as "Tarzzan"—a stage name derived from a viral contemporary dance performance in nude‑toned attire—with the group's single album Famous on June 23. In their eponymous release, Lee released his first solo single titled "Medusa", accompanied with a music video; it charted at number thirty-five on the Circle Download Chart.

Following his debut, Lee broadened his creative activities, receiving credits as a model, graphic designer, and sound contributor for Eyesmag in 2026, most notably contributing to a Hermès pictorial with the magazine.

== Artistry ==
=== Influence ===
Lee's artistic sensibilities reflect influences across dance, fashion, and music. His foundational training was established at Busan Arts High School under the guidance of contemporary dancer Ha Jung‑oh. He attributes his interest in fashion and eventual transition to modeling to his mother, who studied industrial design, and fashion runways curated by Virgil Abloh for Louis Vuitton. His creative outlook was further shaped by his early exposure to hip‑hop during childhood in the United States, particularly through artists such as Lil Wayne and ASAP Rocky.

== Public image ==
Since his debut as a K-pop idol, Lee has received sustained backlash for perceived cultural appropriation, particularly his "long-standing" use of hairstyles and fashion associated with Black American culture such as grills.

Lee is recognized nationally as a contemporary dancer, frequently described in the media as a "dance prodigy". His reputation extends beyond contemporary dance, with dancers in other genres, including ballet and traditional Korean dance, also familiar with his work and achievements.

== Other ventures ==
=== Endorsements ===
Lee and Cho Yi-hyun became Reebok's official ambassadors for its Vector 93 summer collection.

=== Philanthropy ===
In 2022, Lee participated in the ‘Eco‑friendly Charity Bazaar,’ where he sold personal items for the event organized by Hope Friends Hunger Relief. The proceeds were donated to Spring B Salon (봄B살롱), a community space operated by the social enterprise Happy Sharing to support individuals facing food insecurity.

== Discography ==
=== Singles ===
Title	Year	Peak positions	Album
Title	Year	KOR DL	Album
Collaborations
"For Granted" (Bryan Chase with Tarzzan)	2025	—	Granted
Other charted songs
"Hot" (with Bailey)	2025	31	AllDay Project
"Medusa"	2025	35	AllDay Project
"Would You" (Taeyang feat. Tazzan and Woochan)	2026	31	Quintessence

=== Songwriting credits ===
All song credits are adapted from the Korea Music Copyright Association's database unless stated otherwise.

List of songs, showing year released, artist name, and name of the album
Year	Artist	Title	Album	Lyricist		Composer	
Year	Artist	Title	Album	Credited	With	Credited	With
2025	AllDay Project	"Famous"	Famous	Yes	Woochan, Youngseo, Teddy, Vince, Claudia Valentina, Zikai, Norib	No	–
2025	AllDay Project	"Wicked"	Famous	Yes	Woochan, Annie, Youngseo, Bailey, Vince, Theron Thomas	No	–
2025	AllDay Project	"One More Time"	AllDay Project	Yes	Vince, Bailey, Jesse Bluu	Yes	Kush, Jesse Bluu, VVN, Bailey, Dominsuk
2025	AllDay Project	"Look at Me"	AllDay Project	Yes	Bailey, Woochan, Youngseo, Annie, Teddy, Vince, Zikai, Malachiii, Jesse Bluu	Yes	24, Kush, Zikai, Malachiii, Jesse Bluu
2025	AllDay Project	"You and I"	AllDay Project	Yes	Woochan, Youngseo, Kush, Zikai, Malachiii, Jesse Bluu	No	–
2025	Tarzzan, Bailey	"Hot"	AllDay Project	Yes	Bailey, Vince, Tiyon "TC" Mack, Kevin Yancy, Chaz Jackson	Yes	Chaz Jackson, Tiyon "TC" Mack, Kevin Yancy, JuniorChef, Nick Spiders
2025	Tarzzan	"Medusa"	AllDay Project	Yes	Nick Spiders	Yes	Nick Spiders, JuniorChef, Actual Hate, Legiiion
2025	Bryan Chase, Tarzzan	"For Granted"	Granted	Yes	Bryan Chase, Nick Spiders	No	–
2026	AllDay Project	"I Don't Bargain"	Non-album single	Yes	Bailey, Woochan, Annie, Vince	No	–
2026	Taeyang (feat. Tarzzan, Woochan)	"Would You"	Quintessence	Yes	Taeyang, Woochan, Teddy, Lukasz Gottwald, Theron Thomas, Rocco Valdes, Ryan Ogren, Ashley Gorley, Vince	No	–
2026	Big Bang	"Biiig"	Non-album single	No	–	Yes	Kush, G-Dragon, Ido, Lil Aaron, Kaine, 24, Teddy
2026	AllDay Project	"Talk"	Crash	Yes	Woochan, Bailey, Annie, Vince, Teddy, DCF, Leyla Blue, Jackson Monroe	No	–
2026	AllDay Project	"Crash"	Crash	Yes	Woochan, Bailey, DCF, Teddy, Jackson Monroe, Theron Thomas, Zikai, Kuinvi, Vince	No	–
2026	AllDay Project	"Do It Like This"	Crash	Yes	Bailey, Vince, Malachii, Jackson Nanca	Yes	The Elements, Jhune, Malachii, Vince
2026	AllDay Project	"No Limit"	Crash	Yes	Bailey, Woochan, Annie, Youngseo, Teddy, Vince, Malachii, Zikai	No	–
2026	AllDay Project	"Up All Night"	Crash	Yes	Bailey, Woochan, Annie, Youngseo, Kush, VVN, DCF, Leyla Blue, Jackson Nance, Vince	No	–

== Videography ==
=== Music videos ===
List of music videos, showing year released and name of the directors
Year	Title	Director(s)	Ref.
2026	"Medusa"	Unknown	

== Filmography ==
=== Television shows ===
Year	Title	Role	Ref.
2026	Take a Hike	Himself	

=== Music videos ===
Year	Song title	Artist	Ref.
2023	"I Do"	I-dle	
2024	"Supernatural"	NewJeans	
