= Kida Burns =

American dancer (born 2002)

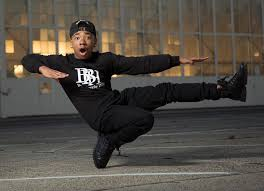
- Born: Leon Burns; April 8, 2002 (age 24); Sacramento, California, U.S.
- Other name: Kida the Great
- Occupations: Dancer; choreographer; actor
- Notable credits: So You Think You Can Dance: The Next Generation; World of Dance

Leon "Kida" Burns (born April 8, 2002), known professionally as Kida the Great, is an American hip hop dancer, choreographer, and actor. He gained recognition through his Instagram dance videos of popular hip-hop songs such as "Don't Sleep" by Dorian and "Cut It" by O.T. Genasis. In 2016, Burns was crowned "America's Favorite Dancer" in the thirteenth season of So You Think You Can Dance: Next Generation coming 1st place.

== Personal life ==
Burns was born on April 8, 2002, in Sacramento, California. He is the son of Tanisha Hunter and Leon Burns, Sr. He is the sixth child of his mother's seven children.

Burns's first teacher was his oldest brother, Shaheem Sanchez Burns, who started mentoring him when he was 4. He was also inspired by the dance films Breakin' and the Step Up series, which he watched with his father.

In 2014, Burns's father died from complications of H1N1.

== Career ==
At age 11, Burns began training at Chapkis Dance Studio in Suisun City, California under So You Think You Can Dance Season 1 contestant Greg Chapkis.

In 2010, Burns posted a video online showing him dancing with the crew The Art of Teknique; it was reposted by rappers Ludacris and Tyrese. The video landed Burns and his crew on The Ellen DeGeneres Show.

In 2015, Burns performed solo on The Queen Latifah Show and The Rachel Ray Show, which caught the attention of So You Think You Can Dance producers.

In 2016, Burns claimed the grand prize of $250,000 when he was voted America's Favorite Dancer on the thirteenth season of So You Think You Can Dance: Next Generation for 1st place. He also appeared in Chris Brown's music video for party with fellow hip hop dancers Ayo & Teo. He performed with singer Usher at the 2016 BET Awards.

In 2012, Burns appeared in the movie Battlefield America as Thomas Brown.

In 2020, Kida participated in the fourth season of World of Dance, alongside Bailey Sok of S-Rank and Kinjaz. Burns choreographed and appeared in the music video for Justin Bieber's song "Come Around Me". He also made a cameo appearance in the Disney movie Zombies 2.

He was a featured dancer in Kendrick Lamar's 2024 video release diss of Drake in "Not Like Us" on July 4.
