= The PULSE on Tour =

- Industry: Dance, Music and Entertainment
- Founded: 2005
- Headquarters: New York City, New York, United States
- Website: ThePULSEonTour.com

The PULSE on Tour is an international traveling dance convention and workshop focused on non-competitive training. Past and present faculty include choreographers for America's Best Dance Crew, So You Think You Can Dance, The X Factor, and America's Got Talent. PULSE staff have garnered industry recognition for their work, with nominations for Emmy Awards, VH1 Awards, Teen Choice Awards, MTV Movie Awards, and more. PULSE alumni have gone on to perform with Britney Spears, Justin Bieber, Beyoncé, Lady Gaga, Nicki Minaj, appear on The Voice, Glee, and The Ellen DeGeneres Show, and secure other various professional opportunities throughout the entertainment industry.

== Faculty ==
As of 2016, PULSE instructors consist of Brian Friedman, Cris Judd, Dave Scott, Gil Duldulao, Brooke Lipton, Ian Eastwood, Tricia Miranda, Tucker Barkley, Jillian Meyers, Tessandra Chavez, Kyle Hanagami, Kayla Radomski, and Megan Lawson. Previous guest teachers have included Will "Willdabeast" Adams and Laurieann Gibson, amongst others.

== Notable alumni ==
Notable dancers and choreographers who have trained at PULSE and graduated successfully include Gotham actress Camren Bicondova of 8 Flavahz, Kaelynn Gobert-Harris and Charlize Glass of 8 Flavahz, Jade Chynoweth, Sean Lew, Joanna Gomez, Zach Venegas, Jordyn Jones, Kaycee Rice, Gabe De Guzman, Bailey Sok and more.
