= Famous (single album) =

- Digital cover

Single album by AllDay Project
- Released: June 23, 2025
- Length: 5:37
- Languages: Korean; English
- Label: The Black Label
- Producers: Jumpa; 24; Dominsuk; Vince

AllDay Project chronology
Famous (2025)	AllDay Project (2025)

Singles from Famous
- 1. "Famous" Released: June 16, 2025; 2. "Wicked" Released: June 23, 2025

Famous is the debut single album by South Korean co-ed group AllDay Project. It was released on June 23, 2025, by The Black Label, and consists of its title track and the single "Wicked".

== Background and release ==
On June 6, 2025, The Black Label announced that they would be debuting a new co-ed group, opening their official social media accounts and posting a photo of the members together. The members subsequently posted images holding an approval letter to their personal Instagram accounts, and it was later confirmed that the group would make their debut on June 23. On June 16, the music video for the title track was released on YouTube, garnering 10 million views in four days. The single album was released on June 23, 2025, alongside two different performance videos for the B-side, "Wicked".

== Composition ==
The title track, "Famous" is a hip hop song that contains a danceable beat made up of heavy synth bass and a guitar riff, on top of which the members deliver "colorful rap flows and melody lines". Its lyrics discuss confidence and ambition in someone who is "not famous but already receiving attention." The second track, "Wicked", contains an experimental beat that incorporates elements of Brazilian funk, trap, R&B, and drill, and utilizes repetitive lyrics to create an intense rhythm.

== Track listing ==
Famous track listing
No.	Title	Lyrics	Music	Arrangement(s)	Length
1.	"Famous"	Tarzzan; Woochan; Youngseo; Teddy; Vince; Claudia Valentina; Zikai; Norib	Jumpa; Valentina; Zikai; Norib; Dominsuk; Vince	Jumpa; 24; Dominsuk; Vince	3:00
2.	"Wicked"	Tarzzan; Woochan; Annie; Youngseo; Bailey; Vince; Theron Thomas; Tommy Brown; Amanda Ratchford; Courtlin Edwards	Thomas; Dominsuk; 24; Vince	Dominsuk; 24	2:37
Total length:					5:37

== Personnel ==
Credits adapted from Melon and Tidal.

- AllDay Project – vocals
  - Tarzzan – lyricist
  - Woochan – lyricist
  - Youngseo – lyricist
  - Annie – lyricist (track 2)
  - Bailey – lyricist (track 2)
- Teddy – lyricist (track 1)
- Vince – lyricist, composer (all tracks); arrangement, keyboard (track 1)
- Claudia Valentina – lyricist, composer (track 1)
- Ziaki – lyricist, composer (track 1)
- Norib – lyricist, composer (track 1)
- Jumpa – composer, arrangement (track 1)
- Dominsuk – composer, arrangement, drum kit (all tracks)
- Seo Won Jin – acoustic guitar (track 1)
- 24 – arrangement, keyboard (all tracks); composer (track 2)
- Theron Thomas – lyricist, composer (track 2)
- Tommy Brown – lyricist (track 2)
- Amanda Ratchford – lyricist (track 2)
- Courtlin Edwards – lyricist (track 2)

== Charts ==
=== Weekly charts ===
Chart performance for Famous
Chart (2025)	Peak position
South Korean Albums (Circle)	14

=== Monthly charts ===
Monthly chart performance for Famous
Chart (2025)	Position
South Korean Albums (Circle)	34

== Release history ==
Release history and formats for Famous
Region	Date	Format	Label	Ref.
Various	June 23, 2025	Digital download; streaming	The Black Label	
South Korea	June 23, 2025	CD	The Black Label	
