= Quintessence (Taeyang album) =

2026 studio album by Taeyang

Studio album by Taeyang
- Released: May 18, 2026
- Length: 27:36
- Language: Korean
- Label: The Black Label
- Producers: 9AM; BRLLNT; Chaz Jackson; Dominsuk; Dr. Luke; Ido; J. Que; Jacob Ray; Jonas Jurström; Paul Blanco; Taeyang; Taylor Dexter; The Stereotypes; Vince; Wesley Singerman

Taeyang chronology
Down to Earth (2023)	Quintessence (2026)

Singles from Quintessence
- 1. "Live Fast Die Slow" Released: May 18, 2026

Quintessence is the fourth studio album by the South Korean singer Taeyang. It was released on May 18, 2026, through The Black Label. The album marks his first work in three years since the extended play (EP), Down to Earth (2023), and first full-length in nine years since White Night (2017). It includes guest appearances by Tarzzan and Jo Woo-chan of AllDay Project, and The Kid Laroi.

== Background ==
Quintessence constitutes Taeyang's return to full‑length album production nine years after White Night (2017) and first work following the extended play Down to Earth (2023). The project had been in continuous development for roughly a year leading up to its release on May 18, 2026. The Black Label formally announced the album on April 21, 2026. Its conceptual framework originated in an early A&R meeting in which Taeyang was tasked with defining the project's thematic direction; his subsequent focus on ideas of "essence", "true nature", and artistic fundamentals led him to the term quintessence, which shaped the album's organizing principle and title.

== Composition ==
=== Theme and lyrics ===
Quintessence consists of songs depicting the singer's "true essence". It is a record of self-distillation, and was described to be an attempt to find what is most essentially himself after two decades in the spotlight. It focuses on what feels most like him while still being something new.

It includes messages and consistent themes of time, life and death, and the desire for something to last forever. Depicted in the album's lead single, "Live Fast Die Slow", the fastest-tempo song he has ever released, shows an expression of his determination to live on his own terms regardless of how quickly the world around him changes.

== Release and promotion ==
Quintessence was released on the artist's birthday, a detail he cited as a "meaningful gift to fans". It was accompanied by an exhibition running between May 18–31, designed to expand the album's themes into a visual and spatial experience.

== Track listing ==
Quintessence track listing
No.	Title	Lyrics	Music	Length
1.	"Bad"	Taeyang; Jonathan Yip; Jeremy Reeves; Ray Romulus; Jeff Baranowski; Luke Milano; August Rigo; Kameron Glasper; Vince	Yip; Reeves; Romulus; Baranowski; Milano; Rigo; Glasper	2:30
2.	"Live Fast Die Slow"	Taeyang; Kaine; Lil Aaron; Vince; Teddy	Teddy; Kush; VVN; Dominsuk; Lil Aaron; Kaine	3:00
3.	"Would You" (featuring Tarzzan and Woochan)	Taeyang; Tarzzan; Woochan; Teddy; Lukasz Gottwald; Theron Thomas; Rocco Valdes; Ryan Ogren; Ashley Gorley; Vince	Gottwald; Thomas; Valdes; Ogren; Gorley; Vince; Woochan	3:15
4.	"Movie"	Tablo; Vince; Yip; Reeves; Romulus; Baranowski; Milano; Rigo; Glasper	Yip; Reeves; Romulus; Baranowski; Milano; Rigo; Glasper	1:51
5.	"Open Up" (featuring the Kid Laroi)	Taeyang; Tablo; Antonio Stith; Vince; Charlton Howard	Chaz Jackson; Stith; Howard	2:43
6.	"Love Like This"	Paul Blanco	Taeyang; Blanco	2:57
7.	"Yes"	Taeyang; Blanco; Vince	Blanco	2:30
8.	"Now"	Taeyang; Stith; Camo; Blanco; Vince; Yip; Reeves; Romulus; Baranowski; Milano; Rigo; Glasper; Jackson	Stith; Yip; Reeves; Romulus; Baranowski; Milano; Rigo; Glasper	2:48
9.	"G.O.A.T"	Taeyang; Tablo; Blanco; Sophie Simmons; Dewain Whitmore Jr.; Patrick 'j.Que' Smith	Simmons; Whitmore Jr; Smith; Jonas Jurström	2:50
10.	"4U"	Taeyang; Wildberry; Whitmore Jr; Smith; Tony Ferarri	Whitmore Jr; Smith; Ferarri; Taylor Dexter; Wesley Singerman; Jacob Ray	3:06

== Charts ==
=== Weekly charts ===
Weekly chart performance for Quintessence
Chart (2026)	Peak position
Japanese Albums (Oricon)	28
Japanese Digital Albums (Oricon)	9
Japanese Top Albums Sales (Billboard Japan)	34
South Korean Albums (Circle)	14

=== Monthly charts ===
Monthly chart performance for Quintessence
Chart (2026)	Peak position
South Korean Albums (Circle)	32

== Release history ==
Release history for Quintessence
Region	Date	Format	Label
South Korea	May 18, 2026	CD	The Black Label
Various	May 18, 2026	Digital download; streaming	The Black Label
