= AllDay Project (EP) =

- Digital cover

EP by AllDay Project
- Released: December 8, 2025
- Length: 17:19
- Languages: Korean; English
- Label: The Black Label
- Producers: Teddy; Kush; Dominsuk; VVN; 24; JuniorChef; Nick Spiders; Ido; Chaz Jackson; Vince; Nohc; Actual Hate

AllDay Project chronology
Famous (2025)	AllDay Project (2025)

Singles from AllDay Project
- 1. "One More Time" Released: November 17, 2025; 2. "Look at Me" Released: December 8, 2025

Professional ratings
Review scores
Source	Rating
IZM	2/5 stars

AllDay Project is the first extended play by South Korean co-ed group AllDay Project. It was released on December 8, 2025, by The Black Label, and consists of six tracks, including the lead single "Look at Me" and the pre-release single "One More Time". The EP incorporates elements of hip-hop, drum and bass, Afrobeats and rage genres.

== Background and release ==
On November 3, 2025, AllDay Project released a teaser video revealing that would release a digital single titled "One More Time" on November 17, and that the group's first extended play would be released in December. On November 27, The Black Label announced that the group's self-titled first extended play would be released December 8. The track listing was revealed the same day, including three group songs, two sub-unit songs and a solo song by Tarzzan. Three sets of concept photos were released on November 29 (with the members in winter outfits), December 2 (with the members wearing khaki and brown colors) and December 3 (featuring the members in chic achromatic outfits). Two concept films were released on December 1, with the "Day" version featuring vivid colors, and the "One" version showing the members' silhouettes in darkness. The music video teaser for the lead single "Look at Me" was released on December 5, and the album sampler was released on December 6. The extended play was released on December 8 alongside the music video for "Look at Me".

== Composition ==
The first track, "One More Time", is a "melody-driven drum and bass song". The members' vocals escalate over a "delicately composed melody", and its lyrics describe capturing fleeting moments with a message of "Let's enjoy the present together". The lead single "Look at Me" is a "bright-toned" singing hip hop song with a simple melody and upbeat mood, featuring vocals contrasted with sharp raps displaying the group's synergy and confidence. "You and I" is an Afrobeats-inspired song with vocals from Youngseo and rapping from the other members. The fourth track, "Where You At" is a "playful hip-hop song" performed by Annie and Woochan, and the Tarzzan-Bailey sub-unit track "Hot" has an "early-2000s-inspired groove." The final track, "Medusa", is a rage and rap track performed by Tarzzan, whose title is inspired by the line "See me Medusa" from AllDay Project's previous single "Wicked".

== Track listing ==
AllDay Project track listing
No.	Title	Lyrics	Music	Arrangement(s)	Length
1.	"One More Time"	Vince; Tarzzan; Bailey; Jesse Bluu	Kush; Bluu; VVN; Tarzzan; Bailey; Dominsuk	Teddy; Kush; Dominsuk; VVN	3:15
2.	"Look at Me"	Tarzzan; Bailey; Woochan; Youngseo; Annie; Teddy; Vince; Zikai; Malachiii; Bluu	24; Kush; Zikai; Malachiii; Bluu; Tarzzan	24; JuniorChef; Nick Spiders	2:39
3.	"You and I"	Vince; Woochan; Tarzzan; Youngseo; Kush; Zikai; Malachiii; Bluu	Kush; Zikai; Malachiii; Bluu	Teddy; Kush; Dominsuk	3:09
4.	"Where You At" (Annie and Woochan)	Woochan; Annie; Teddy; Vince	Dominsuk; Woochan; Vince	Dominsuk; Ido	2:42
5.	"Hot" (Tarzzan and Bailey)	Tarzzan; Bailey; Vince; Tiyon "TC" Mack; Kevin Yancy; Chaz Jackson	Tarzzan; Jackson; Mack; Yancy; JuniorChef; Spiders	Jackson; Vince; 24; Nohc; JuniorChef; Spiders; Ido	3:11
6.	"Medusa" (Tarzzan)	Tarzzan; Spiders	Tarzzan; Spiders; JuniorChef; Actual Hate	Spiders; JuniorChef; Actual Hate	2:23
Total length:					17:19

== Personnel ==
Credits adapted from Tidal.

- AllDay Project – vocals (tracks 1–3)
  - Annie – vocals (track 4)
  - Woochan – vocals (track 4)
  - Tarzzan – vocals (tracks 5–6)
  - Bailey – vocals (track 5)
- Dominsuk – drum kit (tracks 1, 3, 4)
- VVN – keyboard (track 1)
- Kush – keyboard (tracks 1, 3)
- JuniorChef – drum kit (tracks 2, 6), keyboard (track 5)
- 24 – keyboard (tracks 2, 5)
- Nick Spiders – keyboard (tracks 2, 5, 6)
- Lee Tae-ook – bass guitar, electric guitar (tracks 3, 5)
- Ido – keyboard (track 4)
- Kim Eun-se – bass guitar (track 5)
- Chaz Jackson – drum kit (track 5)
- Vince – drum kit (track 5)
- Nohc – keyboard (track 5)
- Adam Grover – mastering
- Chris Gehringer – mastering
- Denis Kosiak – mixing (tracks 1–3)
- Geoff Swan – mixing (track 4)
- Matt Cahill – additional mixing engineering (track 4)
- Bainz – co-mix engineering (track 5)
- Patrizio Pigliapoco – co-mix engineering (track 5)
- Emiliano Olocco – additional mixing engineering (track 5)
- Ben Lidsky – mixing (track 6)
- Carl Bang – recording, engineering (tracks 1–2)
- Danny Oh – recording, engineering
- Gun Yun – recording, engineering (tracks 1, 2, 4)
- Jackson Park – recording, engineering (tracks 1–3, 5, 6)
- Ethan Chae – recording, engineering (tracks 4, 5)

== Charts ==
=== Weekly charts ===
Weekly chart performance for AllDay Project
Chart (2025)	Peak position
South Korean Albums (Circle)	2

=== Monthly charts ===
Monthly chart performance for AllDay Project
Chart (2025)	Position
South Korean Albums (Circle)	6

== Release history ==
Release history and formats for Famous
Region	Date	Format	Label	Ref.
Various	December 8, 2025	Digital download; streaming	The Black Label	
South Korea	December 8, 2025	CD	The Black Label	
