= Kristii =

Background information
- Born: Vienna, Austria
- Genres: R&B, pop
- Occupation: Singer-songwriter
- Years active: 2018–present
- Website: kristiiofficial.com

Kristii is an Austrian-born R&B-pop singer and songwriter. Her collaborators include producers Scott Storch, Adonis Shropshire, Deekay, Paperboy Fabe and Verse Simmonds, as well as performers O.T. Genasis.

== Early life and education ==
Kristii was born and raised in Vienna, where she sang as a lead singer in a choir and studied classical opera, developing a three and half-octave lyrical soprano range. After graduating from the American International School in Vienna (AIS), she moved to London to study acting at the University of the Arts London.

== Career ==
Kristii debut single "Recovery" was released independently. Remixes by Dave Audé and Dave Matthias entered American dance radio, with the latter reaching No. 8 on the Billboard Dance/Mix Show Airplay. Her track "I Can't Live Without You" also charted at #42 on the Bllboard Dance/Mix Show Airplay.

=== 2017-2018: Touring and Recovery EP ===
Performances included LA Pride Festival (USA), Monrovia Music Festival, Avalon club, House of Blues, Viper Rooms and other places across USA and Israel.

=== 2019–2021: Touring and Friendship EP ===
In 2019, Kristii was the opening act for rapper Tory Lanez on the 23-city Memories Don't Die Tour across the United States and Canada. She continued working with Grammy-winning producer Scott Storch and songwriter Verse Simmonds on the single "All The Way." and "Saucy"

=== 2022–2025: Genre change and chart success ===
"Triangle" (December 2024); and "Comfortable" (March 2025) featuring Verse Simmonds.. Performances with O. T. Genasis and on Universal CityWalk Hollywood. Interview on On with Mario Lopez podcast.

=== 2026-present: Lost&Found era ===
In 2026, Kristii dropped the mask together with producer Scott Storch, marking a in a new era of R&B. Her album "Lost & Found," released in January. Delayed four times, the project explores the duality of a woman who cheated death to find her true voice.

Performances in Austria, Turkey and Spain.

== Discography ==
Albums

- Lost&Found - Album
- Recovery - EP
  - "Recovery" (Dave Matthias remix) – No. 8 Billboard Dance/Mix Show Airplay
  - Other remixes by Dave Audé and DJ KNAPPY
- I Can't Live Without You - EP
  - "I Can't Live Without You" – No. 42 Billboard Dance/Mix Show Airplay
- Pink Butterfly - EP

Most recent releases - 2026 album "Lost&Found"

- secrets
- vampire
- growing up
- comfortable – feat. Verse Simmonds
- sunrise
- everyday
- pump
- party
- lost&found
- heart
- lightning

Other Singles

- Break The Rules (DJ Rebel Remix)
- Bare
- Triangle
- All The Way
- Crazy
- Moonchild
- Saucy

== Personal life ==
Kristii divides her time between Los Angeles, USA and Vienna, Austria. Fluent in German, French and English.

In parallel to being a singer-songwriter she also continues her professional acting career. With four lead and two supporting roles in full feature films and a number of soundtracks. Her most notable achievement to date in acting is receiving a Cannes Film Festival Un Certain Regard nomination and interviews for French radio and press.
