= Jo Woo-chan =

South Korean singer and rapper (born 2005)

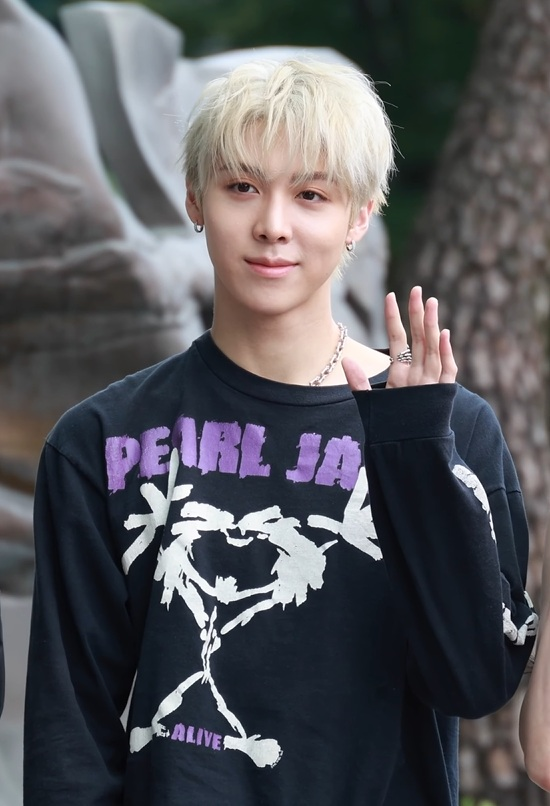
- Jo in July 2025
- Born: January 20, 2005 (age 21); Seoul, South Korea
- Education: Hongik University
- Occupations: Singer; rapper; actor
- Years active: 2017–present
- Musical career
- Genres: K-pop; hip hop
- Instrument: Vocals
- Labels: Cube; The Black Label
- Member of: AllDay Project
- Formerly of: United Cube; OG School Project

Korean name
- Hangul: 조우찬
- RR: Jo Uchan
- MR: Cho Uch'an

Signature
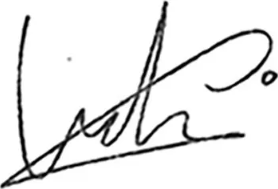

Jo Woo-chan (Korean: 조우찬; born January 20, 2005), known mononymously as Woochan, is a South Korean singer and rapper. He was a contestant on Show Me the Money 6 in 2017. He released his first collaborative single, "OGZ", on January 5, 2018. He debuted as a member of the South Korean co-ed group AllDay Project under The Black Label in June 2025.

== Early life ==
Jo was born on January 20, 2005. As a child, he was active as an actor and model, having starred in commercials for various brands.

== Career ==
=== 2017–2024: Early career ===
In 2017, at 12 years old, Jo Woo-chan became the youngest contestant in the history of Show Me the Money 6 and earned the nickname "Lil Dok2". During the show, he released three collaborative singles, "1/N" with Dynamic Duo, "What You Call Is The Price" featuring Nucksal, and "VVIP" featuring Sik-K. Jo was eliminated in the semi-finals. As a guest, Jo featured on Hui's song "Wake me up" for KBS's pilot music variety show, Hyena on the Keyboard. The single was released on October 9 on various online Korean music sites. In October 2017, Jo was cast in the JTBC short film Father's Sword by Director Jeong Yoon-cheol. In November 2017, Jo was appointed as a public relations ambassador for the Korea Scout Association.

On January 5, 2018, Jo participated in a joint project group called OG School Project alongside Starship trainees Park Hyun-jin and Achillo, they released the single "OGZ", produced by GroovyRoom.

In July 2019, it was revealed that Jo had departed from Cube Entertainment. In the same month, he released his first digital single album, ID Schoolboy Pt.1. On August 13, Jo released his second digital single album, ID Schoolboy Pt.2.

On May 16, 2020, Jo released his first extended play (EP), ID Schoolboy Pt.3.

In 2021, Jo became a member of Big Hit Music's pre-debut group, Trainee A. However, the project ceased activities and was disbanded at the end of 2022.

On April 13, 2024, Jo released his second solo EP, Blank.

=== 2025–present: AllDay Project ===
Jo debuted as a member of The Black Label's co-ed group AllDay Project in June 2025.

== Discography ==
=== Extended plays ===
Title	Details
ID Schoolboy Pt.3	Released: May 16, 2020; Formats: CD, digital download, streaming; Track listing: 1. You Better Make a Move; 2. Honey Dance; 3. I Don't Care; 4. Exam (feat. BIG Naughty); 5. What U Doin' (feat. Soovi); 6. Catfish (feat. Paloalto); 7. We
Blank	Released: April 13, 2024; Formats: Digital download, streaming; Track listing: 1. Reason; 2. Rage (feat. Kid Milli); 3. Distrust (불신); 4. Shawty; 5. Savior (feat. Norman); 6. Who Wants to Die (feat. Norman); 7. Youth (feat. Kangbin)

=== Singles ===
Title	Year	Peak chart positions	Sales (DL)	Album
Title	Year	KOR	Sales (DL)	Album
"VVIP" (feat. Sik-K, Gaeko)	2017	43	KOR: 88,925	Show Me the Money 6
"1/N" (N분의 1) with Hanhae, Ryno, Nucksal feat. Dynamic Duo	2017	3	KOR: 756,771	Show Me the Money 6
"Brrr get$" (부르는 게 값이야) with Nucksal feat. Gaeko, Don Mills	2017	8	KOR: 174,664	Show Me the Money 6
"Wake Me Up" (with Hui)	2017	— (Note: "Wake Me Up" did not enter Gaon Digital Chart, but peaked at number 90 on Gaon Download Chart.)	KOR: 17,921	Hyena on the Keyboard
"OGZ" with Park Hyun-jin, Achillo (produced by Groovy Room)	2018	—	—N/a	Non-album single
"Reality Check" (feat. Dok2)	2019	—	—N/a	ID Schoolboy Pt.1
"Cola" (feat. Hotchkiss)	2019	—	—N/a	ID Schoolboy Pt.2
"Honey Dance"	2020	—	—N/a	ID Schoolboy Pt.3
"Exam" (feat. Big Naughty)	2020	—	—N/a	ID Schoolboy Pt.3
"Rage" (feat. Kid Milli)	2024	—	—N/a	Blank
"Shawty"	2024	—	—N/a	Blank
"—" denotes releases that did not chart.

=== Other songs ===
Title	Year	Peak chart positions	Album
Title	Year	KOR DL	Album
"Where You At" (with Annie)	2025	25	AllDay Project
"Would You" (Taeyang feat. Tazzan and Himself)	2026	31	Quintessence

=== Songwriting credits ===
All song credits are adapted from the Korea Music Copyright Association, unless cited otherwise.

Year	Song	Artist(s)	Album	Lyricist	Composer
2017	"1/N" (N분의 1)	Himself (with Hanhae, Ryno, Nucksal feat. Dynamic Duo)	Show Me the Money 6	Yes	No
2017	"Brrr get$" (부르는 게 값이야)	Himself (with Nucksal feat. Gaeko, Don Mills)	Show Me the Money 6	Yes	No
2017	"VVIP"	Himself (feat. Sik-K, Gaeko)	Show Me the Money 6	Yes	No
2017	"A Coin PT.2" (동전한닢 PT.2)	Himself (with various artists)	Show Me the Money 6	Yes	No
2017	Wake Me Up	Hui (feat. Jo Woochan)	Hyena on the Keyboard	Yes	No
2018	"OGZ" (produced by GroovyRoom)	Himself (with Park Hyun-jin, Achillo)	—N/a	Yes	No
2019	"Viking" (바이킹)	Himself	ID schoolboy pt.1	Yes	No
2019	"Reality Check" (현실자각타임)	Himself (feat. Dok2)	ID schoolboy pt.1	Yes	No
2019	"Cola"	Himself (feat. Hotchkiss)	ID schoolboy pt.2	Yes	No
2019	"Wave"	Himself	ID schoolboy pt.2	Yes	No
2020	"Niagara" (나이아가라)	Himself (with 45RPM, ONESUN)	Do You Know Hip-Hop?	Yes	Yes
2020	"You Better Make A Move"	Himself	ID schoolboy pt.3	Yes	No
2020	"Honey Dance"	Himself	ID schoolboy pt.3	Yes	No
2020	"I Don't Care"	Himself	ID schoolboy pt.3	Yes	Yes
2020	"Exam" (시험 끝)	Himself (feat. BIG Naughty)	ID schoolboy pt.3	Yes	No
2020	"What U Doin'?"	Himself (feat. SOOVI)	ID schoolboy pt.3	Yes	No
2020	"CATFISH"	Himself (feat. Paloalto)	ID schoolboy pt.3	Yes	No
2020	"WE"	Himself	ID schoolboy pt.3	Yes	Yes
2024	"Reason"	Himself	BLANK	Yes	Yes
2024	"Rage"	Himself (feat. Kid Milli)	BLANK	Yes	Yes
2024	"Distrust" (불신)	Himself	BLANK	Yes	No
2024	"Shawty"	Himself	BLANK	Yes	Yes
2024	"Savior"	Himself (feat. Norman)	BLANK	Yes	Yes
2024	"Who wants to die"	Himself (feat. Norman)	BLANK	Yes	No
2024	"Youth"	Himself (feat. Kangbin)	BLANK	Yes	Yes
2025	"Famous"	AllDay Project	Famous	Yes	No
2025	"Wicked"	AllDay Project	Famous	Yes	No
2025	"Look at Me"	AllDay Project	AllDay Project	Yes	No
2025	"You and I"	AllDay Project	AllDay Project	Yes	No
2025	"Where You At"	Himself (with Annie)	AllDay Project	Yes	Yes
2026	"I Don't Bargain"	AllDay Project	—N/a	Yes	No
2026	"Would You"	Taeyang (feat. Tarzzan and Himself)	Quintessence	Yes	Yes
2026	"Talk"	AllDay Project	Crash	Yes	No
2026	"Crash"	AllDay Project	Crash	Yes	No
2026	"No 한도"	AllDay Project	Crash	Yes	No
2026	"Up All Night"	AllDay Project	Crash	Yes	No

== Filmography ==
=== Films ===
Year	Title	Role	Notes
2017	Father's Sword	Tae-shik	Short film

=== Television ===
Year	Title	Role	Notes	Ref.
2010–11	Reality Self-Conceit	Himself	EBS series, featured in season 3–4	
2017	Show Me the Money 6	Contestant	Semi-finalist	
2019	Player 7	Himself	Ep. 9 & 10	
2020	Do You Know Hip-hop?	Contestant		
2025	M Countdown	Guest host	Ep. 900 & 906	
2025	Music Core	Guest host		

=== Music video appearances ===
Year	Artist	Title	Notes
2016	Pentagon	"Young"	with Juhyeon and other Cube Tree trainees
2017	Soyeon	"Jelly"	with Lai Guanlin, E'Dawn, Wooseok, and Soojin
2019	Paloalto	"Move On"	
