= Annie Moon =

South Korean singer and rapper (born 2002)

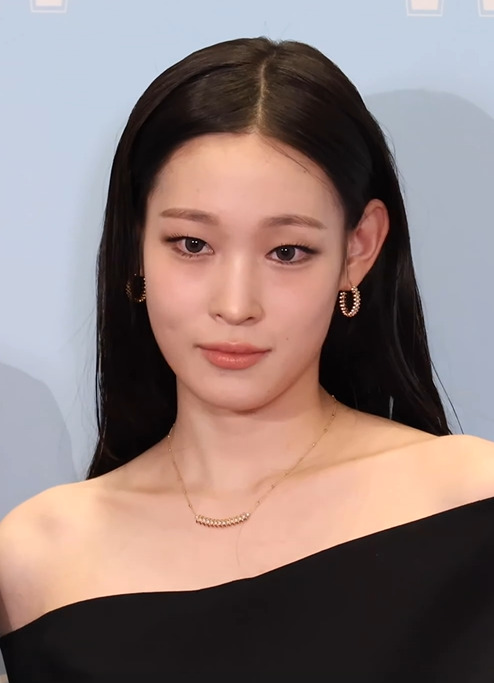
- Moon in 2025
- Born: Moon Seo-yoon; January 23, 2002 (age 24); Seoul, South Korea
- Education: Columbia University
- Occupations: Singer; rapper
- Years active: 2025–present
- Relatives: Lee Myung-hee (maternal grandmother); Lee Byung-chul (maternal great-grandfather); Chung Yong-jin (maternal uncle)
- Family: Samsung family
- Musical career
- Genre: K-pop
- Instrument: Vocals
- Label: The Black Label
- Member of: AllDay Project

Korean name
- Hangul: 문서윤
- RR: Mun Seoyun
- MR: Mun Sŏyun

Signature
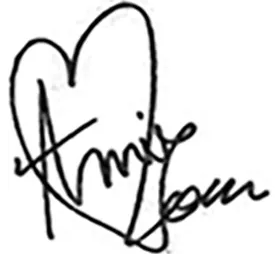

Annie Moon (born Moon Seo-yoon; Korean: 문서윤; January 23, 2002), also known mononymously as Annie, is a South Korean singer and rapper. Born in Seoul, she is a great-granddaughter of Samsung founder Lee Byung-chul and granddaughter of Shinsegae chairwoman Lee Myung-hee. First attracting attention in 2024 as a trainee under The Black Label, she debuted as a member of the South Korean co-ed group AllDay Project in June 2025.

== Early life and education ==
Moon was born on January 23, 2002 in Hannam-dong, Yongsan-gu, Seoul, South Korea to Chung Yoo-kyung, president of Shinsegae, and Moon Sung-wook, CEO of Shinsegae Live Shopping. She is the granddaughter of Shinsegae Group chairwoman Lee Myung-hee on her maternal side and the great-granddaughter of entrepreneur Lee Byung-chul; the latter founded Samsung, South Korea's largest conglomerate. She has a younger sister named Taylor.

Moon attended Gyeonggi Elementary School in Seoul. When she was in third grade, she moved to Manhattan, New York City to study abroad and lived there for 11 years. She attended the United Nations International School and the Chapin School before graduating from Columbia University, studying art history and visual arts.

== Career ==
=== 2024–present: Beginnings and debut with AllDay Project ===
In February 2024, photos of trainees from The Black Label, including Moon and other rumored members of the agency's then-upcoming girl group, Meovv, spread online. On May 12, The Black Label confirmed that Annie would not be debuting in Meovv due to personal reasons.

On June 9, 2025, The Black Label announced their upcoming co-ed group AllDay Project with Annie as one of the members, along with Bailey Sok, Jo Woo-chan, Lee Youngseo, and Tarzzan. The group made their debut with their first single album Famous on June 23. The lead single of the same name reached number one on South Korea's Circle Chart. The group's first EP AllDay Project was released on December 8, with Moon having co-wrote two songs on its track list.

Moon served as a co-host for the 2025 MBC Gayo Daejejeon on December 31. On January 14, 2026, The Black Label announced that Moon will be returning to Columbia University until May to complete her spring semester, and will participate in selected group activities to balance both work and academics. She returned soon after her graduation on Wednesday, May 20th.

== Public image ==
Moon's status as a "chaebol heiress" garnered significant attention in the South Korean media, with her debut marking the first time a member of a prominent Korean chaebol family entered the Korean idol industry. Her aspirations of becoming an idol has drawn comparisons to "a real-life scene from a chaebol drama for many Koreans". Despite skepticism from some, Moon commented, "One thing is certain: thanks to all of you, every day I feel that I made the right choice not to give up and to pursue this path."

Moon's style has also attracted the interest of the media. South China Morning Post wrote, "Moon has shown a knack for incorporating high-end designer pieces into her everyday looks, while adding a modern, edgy twist that resonates with millennials and Gen Z." In photos released to promote AllDay Project's official debut, Moon styled a Balenciaga denim miniskirt with a basic T-shirt, which was noted for evoking an urban image that subtly expressed her "upscale yet accessible fashion sense".

== Artistry ==
=== Influences ===
Moon has said from childhood she has been inspired by 2NE1 and BigBang. She cites CL as her role model.

== Discography ==
=== Songwriting credits ===
All song credits are adapted from the Korea Music Copyright Association's database unless stated otherwise.

Year	Song	Artist	Album	Notes
2025	"Wicked"	AllDay Project	Famous	As a lyricist
2025	"Look At Me"	AllDay Project	AllDay Project	As a lyricist
2025	"Where You At"	AllDay Project	AllDay Project	As a lyricist
2026	"I Don't Bargain"	AllDay Project	Non-album single	As a lyricist
2026	"Talk"	AllDay Project	Crash	As a lyricist
2026	"No Limit"	AllDay Project	Crash	As a lyricist
2026	"Up All Night"	AllDay Project	Crash	As a lyricist
