= Coke N Butter =

Mixtape by O.T. Genasis
- Released: November 12, 2016
- Recorded: 2016
- Genre: Hip hop; trap
- Length: 37:00
- Label: Conglomerate; Atlantic
- Producer: BeatMonsters; BricksOnDaBeat; Go Grizzly; ITrez Beats; Jereme Jay; Juice808; LBeatz; Murda Beatz; OG Parker; Yung Lan; Zaytoven

O.T. Genasis chronology
Rhythm & Bricks (2015)	Coke N Butter (2016)

Singles from Coke N Butter
- 1. "Push It" Released: November 10, 2016

Coke N Butter is a mixtape by American rapper O.T. Genasis. It was released on November 12, 2016. The project consists of twelve tracks, with guest appearances from 2 Chainz, T.I., YG, Remy Ma, and Quavo, with production from BeatMonsters, BricksOnDaBeat, Go Grizzly, ITrez Beats, Jereme Jay, Juice 808, LBeatz, Murda Beatz, OG Parker, Yung Lan, and Zaytoven. The mixtape was released through Conglomerate and Atlantic Records.

== Track listing ==
No.	Title	Writer(s)	Producer(s)	Length
1.	"Plug On Da Line"	Odis Flores; Shakur Thomas	Juice 808	2:58
2.	"Right Back"	Flores; Milan Modi	Yung Lan; BeatMonsters	2:53
3.	"Traffic"	Flores; Modi	Yung Lan	2:38
4.	"Feelings"	Flores; Joshua Parker; Xavier Dotson; Shane Lindstrom	Zaytoven; OG Parker; Murda Beatz	3:26
5.	"Weigh the Weight"	Flores	BricksOnDaBeat	3:15
6.	"Thick" (featuring 2 Chainz)	Flores; Kevin Price; Tauheed Epps	Go Grizzly	3:30
7.	"Go Off"	Flores; Price	Go Grizzly	2:56
8.	"No No No" (featuring YG)	Flores; Jereme Jay; Keenon Jackson	Jay	3:11
9.	"Get Racks" (featuring T.I.)	Flores; Thomas; Clifford Harris, Jr.	Juice 808	3:31
10.	"Bust It"	Flores; Johnathan Priester	Supah Mario	2:46
11.	"All the Hoes"	Flores; Jay; Montre Edmonds	ITrez Beats; Jay	3:12
12.	"Push It" (featuring Remy Ma and Quavo)	Flores; Mauricio Rosales; Reminisce Mackie; Quavious Marshall	LBeatz	2:56
Total length:				37:00
