= Dave Scott (choreographer) =

American hip-hop choreographer and talent developer (1972–2025)

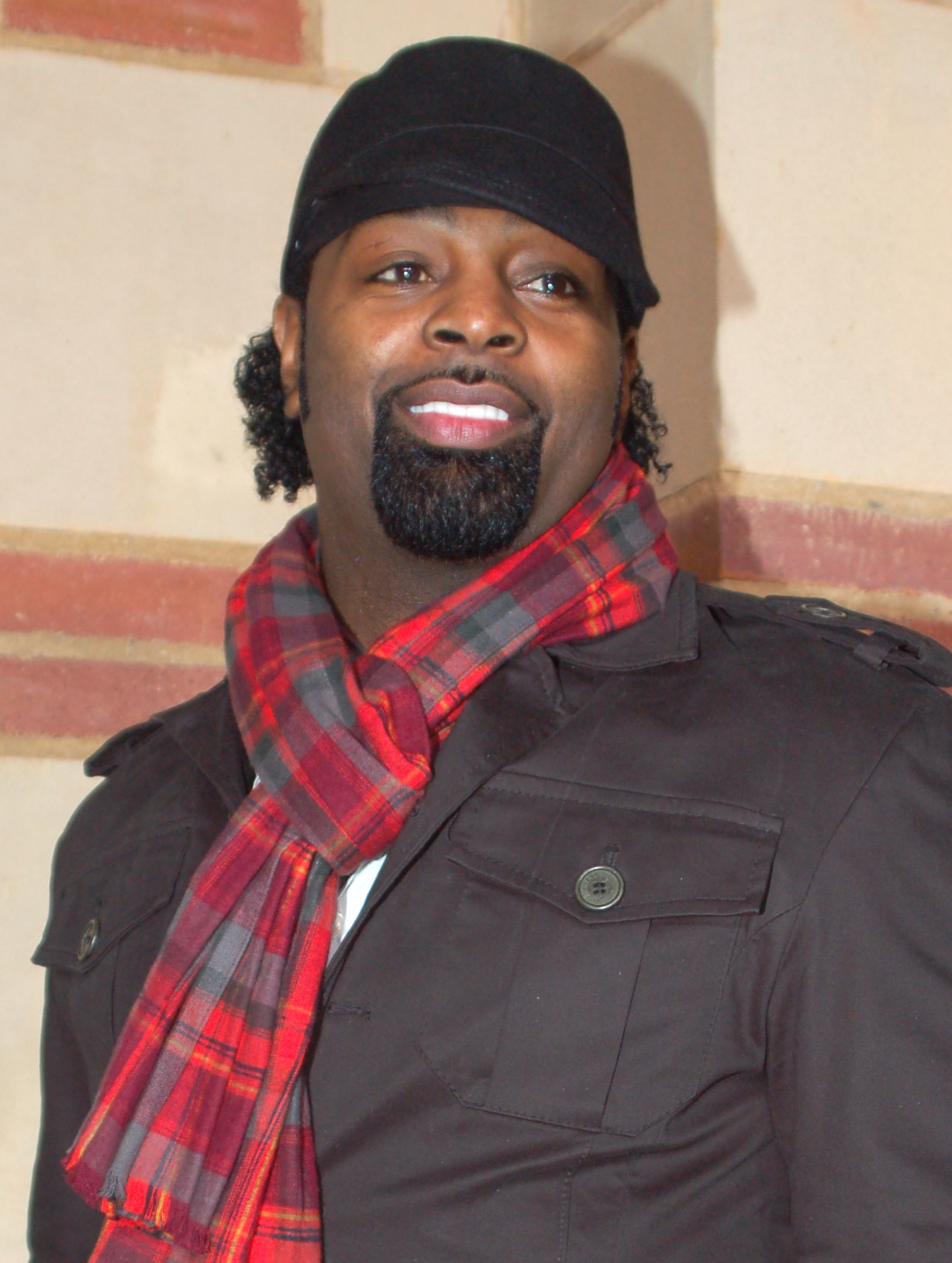
- Scott in 2010
- Born: August 15, 1972; Los Angeles, California, U.S.
- Died: June 16, 2025 (aged 52); Las Vegas, Nevada, U.S.
- Education: Weber State University
- Occupations: Choreographer; talent developer
- Agent: McDonald Selznick Associates
- Height: 6 ft 4 in (193 cm)
- Awards: Best Choreography in Film – Fred and Adele Astaire Award; 2008 Step Up 2: The Streets; Best Choreography in a Feature Film – American Choreography Award; 2004 You Got Served

David Lee Scott Jr. (August 15, 1972 – June 16, 2025) was an American hip-hop dance teacher, choreographer and talent developer. He gained widespread success from his choreography in movies, primarily the 2004 dance film You Got Served and the 2008 dance film Step Up 2: The Streets. He was a resident choreographer on So You Think You Can Dance and The PULSE on Tour dance convention.

== Early life ==
Scott was born in Los Angeles on August 15, 1972 and raised in Compton, California. He was 6 ft 4 in (193 cm) and never took any dance classes or had any formal training. He started dancing as a hobby when he was 15. He learned how to dance from watching musicals, b-boy movies, and music videos, namely those of Michael Jackson whom he cited as one of his influences. He acknowledged hip-hop dance pioneers Stefan "Mr. Wiggles" Clemente and Timothy "Popin' Pete" Solomon as influences as well.

As a teenager, he further developed his skills by forming his own b-boy crew and battling other crews in his neighborhood. After graduating high school, Scott attended Weber State University on a basketball scholarship where he earned an associate's degree in business. He got his first professional dance job while in Utah by chance when he was asked to replace a dancer on a concert tour after being spotted dancing in a club. He later returned to California and started his career by dancing on tours and in music videos.

== Career ==
From tours and music videos, he built relationships in the dance community and moved into teaching classes and doing choreography for film and television. He described his choreography style as aggressive, melodic, and energetic. He worked with singers such as Ginuwine, B2K, Tyrese, Brian McKnight, Jon B, IMx, rapper Bow Wow, and Olympic gold medalist Tara Lipinski. He was the choreographer and co-creator of teen R&B group Mindless Behavior.

In 2012, he co-choreographed the Ubisoft video game The Hip Hop Dance Experience with Laurieann Gibson and b-boy David "Kid David" Shreibman. As of May 2013, he was a mentor/judge on Danceamatic.com, a website that hosts monthly choreography competitions.

=== Film ===
In 2001, Scott formed the teen R&B group B2K and served as their choreographer and stylist. With the group he went on to choreograph the movie You Got Served which featured all four singers in primary roles. In 2004, he won an American Choreography Award for Best Choreography in a Feature Film. Following the success of the movie, he released an instructional dance DVD, You Got Served:Take it to the Streets which teaches viewers how to do the dance routines featured in the film. In addition to You Got Served, he co-choreographed Step Up 2: The Streets with Jamal Sims and Nadine "Hi Hat" Ruffin. In 2008, he won a Fred and Adele Astaire Award for Best Choreography in Film.

Scott also choreographed the movies Fresh, Stomp the Yard, Dance Flick, House Party 4, and Coach Carter. In 2010, Scott appeared in the independent documentary MOVE — a film about how people in the dance industry were able to go from dancing as a hobby to dancing as a career. He choreographed the 2013 film Battle of the Year: The Dream Team which is based on the 2007 documentary Planet B-Boy.

=== Television ===
In 2003, he was a guest choreographer on The Wade Robson Project. He was also a guest choreographer on Step It Up and Dance and on season seven of Dancing with the Stars. Beginning with season three he was a recurring hip-hop choreographer on the show So You Think You Can Dance.

=== Teaching ===
In conjunction with Debbie Allen Dance Academy, Scott served as the director of the Los Angeles Hip Hop Intensive. He was a faculty member with PULSE dance convention, Millennium Dance Complex, and Broadway Dance Center.

== Death ==
Scott died due to organ failure at a hospital in Las Vegas, on June 16, 2025, at the age of 52.
