= LemonGrass =

Mexican musical group

- Origin: Mexico
- Genres: Teen pop, Pop, Latin Pop, Children's music, Urban
- Occupations: Singers, Dancers, Actors, Models
- Years active: 2015–2020
- Labels: Sony Music México; Bobo Producciones
- Members: Ivanna Yael Sophie Oscar Keira
- Past members: Nathan Paula Emiliano Jelissa Matias
- Website: http://www.grupolemongrass.com/

LemonGrass is a Mexican musical group, formed on August 12, 2015. The concept pays tribute to its predecessor, known as OV7, also known as La Onda Vaselina. The current members of the group are Ivanna, Sophie, Yael, Oscar, Keira, and Matias. For personal reasons, the members Jelissa, Emiliano, Paula, and Nathan had to leave the group. They have recorded 2 albums, which are LemonGrass and LemonGrass Deluxe Edition, which feature several urban songs.

== History ==
=== 2015: Formation and official debut ===
Ari Borovoy, of OV7, planned to create a group of children that would sing, dance, and follow the example of their band. So, they started casting & auditioning to find their talent. Which was answered by more than 900 children who took part. With a total of only seven being chosen. The group was chosen for their acting, dancing, and singing, as well make them unique. The members were picked and were formed into LemonGrass by Ari Borovoy on his show "Plan B"

On August 12, LemonGrass performed their first single "Mi Mundo Gira Contigo" making it their official debut.

On October 9, LemonGrass opened up for OV7 & Kabah in Monterrey, Mexico. They opened up again at the Auditorio Nacional on October 23.

The group had several showcases in which they appeared in commercial plazas in Mexico (Coyoacan Oasis, Coapa Galleries, among others) to promote their new single and some other songs. With their first digital song "Mi Mundo Gira Contigo" they made their debut in the Top 10 of the General Chart on iTunes and generated more than half a million views o the lyric video.

=== 2016: Paying homage to El Papa Francisco, new single and debut album ===
On January 22, 2016, the album "México Se Pinta De Luz" went on sale, featuring the group as well as other singers, such as Lucero, Cristian Castro, Pandora, Pedro Fernández among others. The group participates in this tribute interpreting the songs "LUZ" and "Mi Estrella Guia" accompanied by singers like Carla Mauri, ATL and Jary. This was their paying homage to El Papa Francisco.

On March 31, 2016, their official social media released the name of their next single, "Emily Taught Me To Fly" (Emily me enseño a volar), which became available on online stores at 10 PM that day.

On June 10, they released their debut album LemonGrass.

=== 2017-2018: Touring and repackaged album ===
The group confirmed the re-edition/repackaged of their debut album, a deluxe version that will contain four new songs which will be complementary to the previous ones. In addition, it will contain a DVD with the videos of the new songs. It was released on April 21 through iTunes.

Through their social media, the group announced that they will be attending a series of concerts in different cities of Mexico. The first one will be held on Saturday, March 4 at the Telmex Cultural Center Theater 1, at 1 o'clock in the afternoon. That same day at 5 in the afternoon they will attend their second concert. The presale of tickets was made available on January.

=== 2019: Neon Tour, Jelissa's departure, "Pensando en Ti" - Single ===
On July 25, Bobo Production publicly announced that Jelissa Hernández had departed from the group wishing her the best in her future endeavors. On July 26 it was announced that LemonGrass will be touring all of Mexico, Spain, and the USA. On August 27, 2019, LemonGrass came out with their new single "Pensando en Ti". They made a music video for the song and a lyric one as well. They began promotions for the song as part of their Neon Tour. Sophie stated that the song had a deep meaning of love, something that they never had done before. The transition from the group as kids to teens had played a huge part in the song. On November 29, they came out with a holiday single "Navidad Lemongrass".

== Members ==
Stage Names	Real Name	From	Birth Date	Age
Sophie	Ana Sofía Duránd Pánuco	CDMX, Mexico	May 14, 2003	22
Yael	Miguel Ángel Yael Fernández García	Cancún, Mexico	March 15, 2003	23
Ivanna	Ivanna Alin González Jiménez	CDMX, Mexico	November 19, 2005	20
Keira	Keira Francisca Juarez	Cancún, Mexico	October 1, 2005	20
Óscar	Óscar Aguilar	Pachuca, Mexico	March 4, 2004	21

== Former Members ==
Stage Names	Real Name	From	Birth Date	Age
Jelly	Jelissa Hernández Gilart	Havana, Cuba	November 7, 2005	20
Nathan	Nathan Bank Gottlieb	CDMX, Mexico	December 27, 2002	23
Paula	Ana Paula de León Carrillo	CDMX, Mexico	July 23, 2004	21
Emiliano	Emiliano González Linares	Puebla, Mexico	June 13, 2002	23
Matías	Matías Gruener Zabaleta	TBD	December 4, 2005	16

== Discography ==
=== Albums ===
Album	Album Details	Peak Chart Position
Album	Album Details	MEX
LemonGrass	Released: June 10, 2016; Label: Sony Music Mexico; Format: CD, Digital download	3

=== Singles ===
Title	Year	Peak position	Album
"Mi Mundo Gira Contigo"	2015	—	LemonGrass
"Emily Taught Me To Fly"	2016	—	LemonGrass
"Me Hizo Volar"	2016	—	LemonGrass
"Sing Me to Sleep"	2017	—	Non-album single
"La La La (featuring. Joey Montana)"	2019	TBA	TBA
"Pensando en ti"	2019	—	Non-album single
"Navidad LemonGrass"	2019	—	Non-album single
"Shake It (featuring. Mía Rubín)"	2021	—	Non-album single

=== Other charted songs ===
Title	Year	Album
"Vertigo"	2016	LemonGrass
"Piensa en Mí"	2016	LemonGrass

=== Collaborations ===
Title	Artists	Year	Album
"Mi Estrella Guia"	LemonGrass, ATL, Jary, and Carla Mauri	2016	México Se Pinta De Luz
”La La La”	LemonGrass, Joey Montana	2019	
”Shake It”	LemonGrass ft. Mía Rubín	2021	

== Filmography ==
=== Music videos ===
Title	Year	Director	Album
"Mi Mundo Gira Contigo"	2015	—	LemonGrass
"Emily Taught Me To Fly" ("Me Hizo Volar")	2016	—	LemonGrass
"Vertigo"	2016	—	LemonGrass
"Y Que"	2016	—	LemonGrass
"Otra Dimensión"	2016	—	LemonGrass
"Baila sin Miedo"	2016	—	LemonGrass
"Dance Like an Idiot"	2016	—	LemonGrass
"Piensa en mi"	2016		LemonGrass
"So what"	2016		LemonGrass
"Brush 'Em Off"	2016	—	LemonGrass
"Sing Me to Sleep"	2016	—	LemonGrass (Deluxe Edition)
"Picky"	2017	—	LemonGrass (Deluxe Edition)
"La Bicicleta"	2017	—	LemonGrass (Deluxe Edition)
"Andas en Mi Cabeza"	2017	—	LemonGrass (Deluxe Edition)
"Pierdo la Cabeza"	2017	—	LemonGrass (Deluxe Edition)
"La La La"	2019	—	Non-album Singles
"Pensando en Ti"	2019	—	Non-album Singles
"Navidad LemonGrass"	2019	—	Non-album Singles
"Shake It"	2021	—	Non-album Singles
