= Brian Friedman =

American dancer

- Born: Brian L. Friedman; May 28, 1977 (age 49); Highland Park, Illinois, U.S.
- Occupations: Choreographer; producer; director
- Years active: 1988–present

Brian L. Friedman (born May 28, 1977) is an American dancer and choreographer.

Friedman has choreographed and directed music videos and performances for artists including Britney Spears, Beyoncé, Mariah Carey, Usher, Pink and Ne-Yo.

== Early life ==
Friedman was born in Highland Park, Illinois.

After enrolling in dance classes at age 11, he moved to Los Angeles with his mother. His early screen appearances included the film Newsies and the television series Kids Incorporated.

During his early career, he worked with Michael Jackson and Paula Abdul, followed by work with Twyla Tharp on the film I'll Do Anything.

Friedman later appeared as a dancer in Charlie's Angels and Charlie's Angels: Full Throttle.

At 16, he opened a dance school with his mother in Scottsdale, Arizona, where he taught jazz and hip-hop while she taught ballet and tap.

== Career ==
=== Choreography ===
Friedman has choreographed and directed music videos and performances for artists including Britney Spears, Beyoncé, Mariah Carey, Usher, Pink, and Ne-Yo. His work for Spears includes the music videos for "Toxic" and "I'm a Slave 4 U". He has also choreographed for Will & Grace, The Tonight Show with Jay Leno, the MTV Video Music Awards, and the Billboard Music Awards.

From 2004 to 2016, Friedman served as the creative director of The PULSE on Tour, where he toured around the world mentoring students.

In 2011, Friedman reunited with Britney Spears to choreograph the music videos and performances for her singles "Hold It Against Me" and "Till the World Ends". In 2019, he was responsible for choreographing all musical numbers in Melanie Martinez' first movie, K–12. That same year, Friedman worked with South Korean girl group Itzy for their song "Icy".

In 2025, Friedman came out of his dancing retirement to appear in the video for Lady Gaga's "Abracadabra".

=== Television ===
Friedman appeared as a judge on So You Think You Can Dance. After judging Grease Is the Word, he joined the judging panel for the fourth series of The X Factor in 2007. During the auditions, Friedman moved into the role of creative director and was replaced on the panel by Louis Walsh.

In 2011, Friedman was announced as the choreographer for Irish pop duo Jedward's performance of "Lipstick" at the Eurovision Song Contest 2011.

The following year, he served as creative director for the second season of the American version of The X Factor. His work on its production numbers involved sets and backdrops, choreography and safety supervision.

Friedman left the American series after its second season, and Jamie King took over his position for the third season.

Friedman returned to the British version of The X Factor as creative director in 2014. He also served as creative director of America's Got Talent.

In 2015, Friedman took part in the fifteenth series of I'm a Celebrity...Get Me Out of Here!. He was the second contestant voted out and finished in tenth place.

== Personal life ==
In an early 2015 interview with Attitude magazine for its Love & Marriage commemorative special issue, Friedman and his partner, Daniel Brown, announced plans for their upcoming wedding.

Friedman married his partner in February 2020.

Friedman is a patron of the Urdang Academy.

== Awards ==
Friedman has been nominated for five MTV Video Music Awards, two Music Video Production Association Awards and four American Choreography Awards.
