= AllDay Project =

South Korean co-ed music group

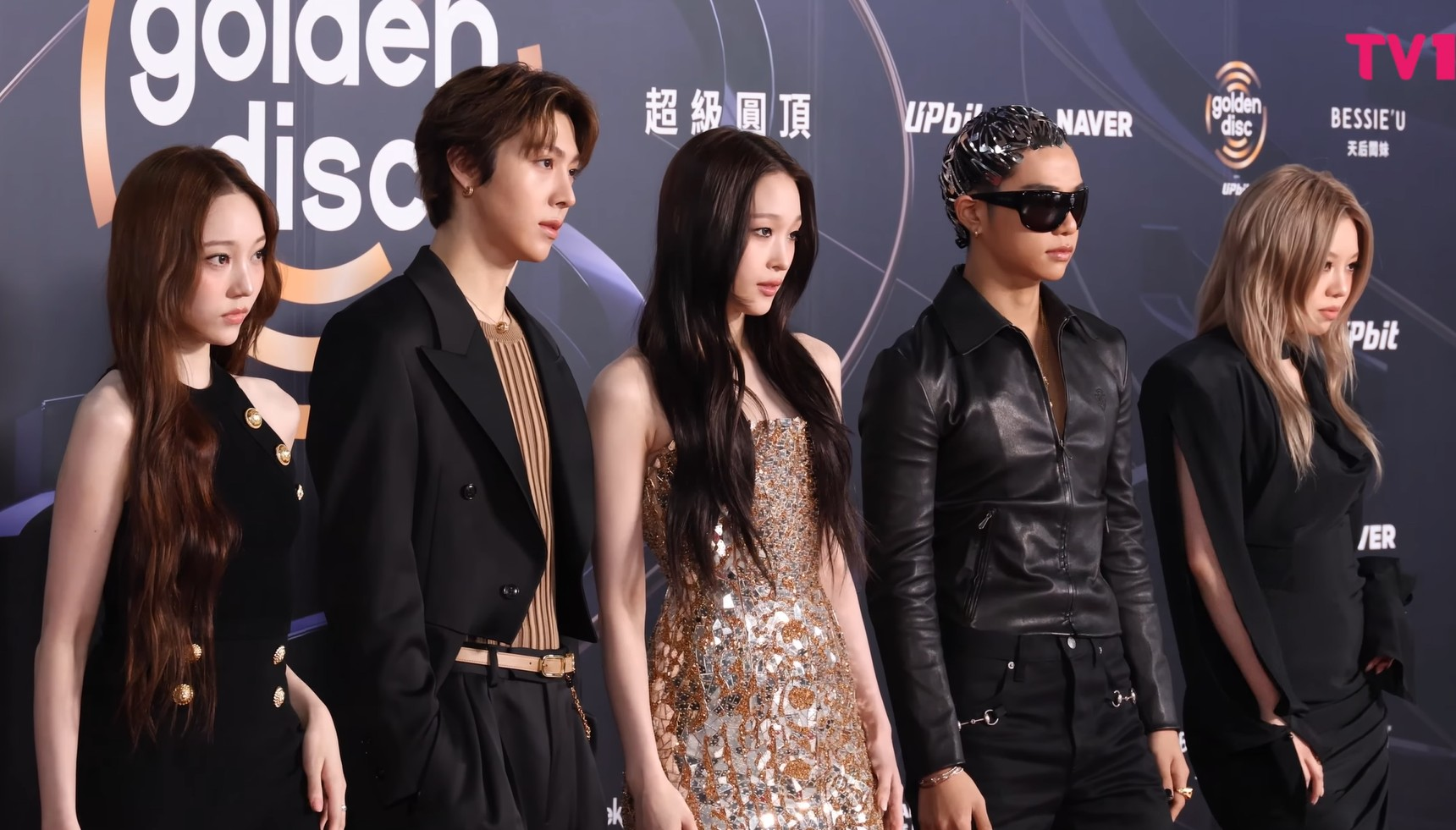
- AllDay Project in January 2026; L–R: Youngseo, Woochan, Annie, Tarzzan, and Bailey

Background information
- Also known as: ΑDΡ
- Origin: Seoul, South Korea
- Genre: K-pop
- Years active: 2025–present
- Label: The Black Label
- Members: Annie; Tarzzan; Bailey; Woochan; Youngseo

AllDay Project (Korean: 올데이 프로젝트, stylized in all caps or abbreviated to ADP) is a South Korean co-ed group formed and managed by The Black Label. The group consists of five members: Annie, Tarzzan, Bailey, Woochan, and Youngseo. They debuted on June 23, 2025, with the single album Famous.

== Name ==
The name "AllDay" was chosen after American music producer Will.i.am of co-ed group Black Eyed Peas reportedly came up with the word upon seeing the five members. On June 22, 2025, AllDay Project announced the name of their official fan club as "Day One", symbolizing "the Day One fan" who will join the group from the beginning and continue with them on an infinite journey.

== History ==
=== Pre-debut activities ===
In early 2024, leaked photos of The Black Label trainees went viral, featuring Ella Gross, Bailey Sok and Annie Moon, among others, causing speculation that they were preparing to debut, though only Gross was confirmed to be under the label. Bailey Sok was notable for her work as a choreographer, and Annie Moon was known for being the granddaughter of Shinsegae chairwoman Lee Myung-hee. Later that year, The Black Label debuted their first group, Meovv, which included only Gross in the line-up.

In 2023, Youngseo was a contestant on R U Next?, a competition show held by Belift Lab to determine the members of what would become Illit. Youngseo placed second, earning a spot in the group, though she departed from Illit and Belift Lab before they debuted. Woochan was also known for appearing on a competition show, having appeared on Show Me the Money 6 in 2017, when he was 12. He went on to train with Big Hit Music as a member of Trainee A, a project to determine a new boy group. Tarzzan had experience prior to AllDay Project as a model and modern dancer, appearing in the music videos for NewJeans's "Supernatural" and I-dle's "I Do".

=== 2025–present: Introduction and debut with Famous ===
On June 6, 2025, The Black Label announced it would be debuting its first co-ed group. AllDay Project is the second group formed by the label, after Meovv's debut in 2024. On June 16, the group released the music video for "Famous", serving as the lead single for their debut single album of the same name. Famous was officially released on June 23, alongside the album's second single, "Wicked". On July 3, AllDay Project won their first music broadcast trophy in 10 days since debut on M Countdown with "Famous". On November 17, the group pre-released their single "One More Time". On December 8, their debut extended play AllDay Project was released alongside the music video for its lead single "Look at Me".

On March 10, 2026, AllDay Project released a collaborative single "I Don't Bargain" with PUBG: Battlegrounds, in commemoration of the video game's 9th anniversary. On September 28, the group released their second EP Crash, with the lead single of the same name. The single "Talk" was pre-released on September 21, while the single "Do It Like This" was pre-released on September 24.

== Endorsements ==
In December 2025, HS Ad revealed AllDay Project as advertising model for Industrial Bank of Korea's mobile banking application "i-ONE", targeting Gen Z customers. In April 2026, the group collaborated with Blue Diamond Growers for its new zero-sugar product Almond Breeze coffee campaign.

In September 2026, they were selected as brand ambassadors for The North Face White Label and presenting its Fall/Winter 2026 season under the theme "Limitless, a movement beyond boundaries".

== Members ==
- Annie (애니)
- Tarzzan (타잔)
- Bailey (베일리)
- Woochan (우찬)
- Youngseo (영서)

== Discography ==
=== Extended plays ===
List of extended plays, showing selected details, selected chart positions, and sales figures
Title	Details	Peak chart positions		Sales
Title	Details	KOR	JPN	Sales
AllDay Project	Released: December 8, 2025; Labels: The Black Label; Formats: CD, digital download, streaming	2	—	KOR: 148,534
Crash	Released: September 28, 2026; Labels: The Black Label; Formats: CD, digital download, streaming	13	69	KOR: 31,789
"—" denotes releases that did not chart in that region.

=== Single albums ===
List of single albums, showing selected details, selected chart positions, and sales figures
Title	Details	Peak chart positions	Sales
Title	Details	KOR	Sales
Famous	Released: June 23, 2025; Labels: The Black Label; Formats: CD, digital download, streaming	12	KOR: 142,555

=== Singles ===
List of singles, showing year released, selected chart positions, and name of the album
Title	Year	Peak chart positions										Album
Title	Year	KOR	KOR Bill.	CHN KOR	HK	JPN Heat.	NZ Hot	SGP	TWN	VIE Hot	WW	Album
"Famous"	2025	1	31	10	19	3	—	— (Note: "Famous" did not enter the Official Singapore Chart, but peaked at number 12 on the Regional Chart.)	16	48	43	Famous
"Wicked"	2025	8	69	20	—	—	—	— (Note: "Wicked" did not enter the Official Singapore Chart, but peaked at number 19 on the Regional Chart.)	—	—	— (Note: "Wicked" did not enter the Billboard Global 200, but peaked at number 108 on the Global Excl. US.)	Famous
"One More Time"	2025	2	2	—	11	—	—	28	9	—	111	AllDay Project
"Look at Me"	2025	23	33	—	—	—	31	—	—	—	—	AllDay Project
"Talk"	2026	161	—	—	—	—	—	—	—	—	—	Crash
"Do It Like This"	2026	186	—	—	—	—	—	—	—	—	—	Crash
"Crash"	2026	11	—	—	—	—	—	—	7	—	—	Crash
"—" denotes releases that did not chart in that region.

=== Collaborative singles ===
List of promotional singles
Title	Year	Album
"I Don't Bargain" (with PUBG: Battlegrounds)	2026	Non-album single

=== Other charted songs ===
List of other charted songs
Title	Year	Peak chart positions	Album
Title	Year	KOR	Album
"You and I"	2025	144	AllDay Project
"Where You At"	2025	113	AllDay Project

== Videography ==
=== Music videos ===
Song title	Year	Director(s)	Ref.
"Famous"	2025	Rimayoon	
"One More Time"	2025	Rohsangyoon	
"Look at Me"	2025	Rimayoon	
"Talk"	2026	Edgar Esteves	
"Do It Like This"	2026	Cho Hyun-seol	
"Crash"	2026	Hideto Hotta	

=== Other videos ===
Song title	Year	Director(s)	Notes	Ref.
"Wicked"	2025	OJun Kwon (ARFILM)	Performance video	

== Live performances ==
=== Music festivals ===
Event	Date	City	Country	Venue	Performed song(s)	Ref.
SBS Gayo Daejeon Summer 2025	July 26, 2025	Goyang	South Korea	KINTEX	"Famous"	
Incheon Airport Sky Festival 2025	November 8, 2025	Incheon	South Korea	Inspire Arena	"Famous"; "Wicked"	
SBS Gayo Daejeon 2025	December 25, 2025	Incheon	South Korea	Inspire Arena	"Look at Me"	

=== Awards shows ===
Event	Date	City	Country	Venue	Performed song(s)	Ref.
2025 Korea Grand Music Awards	November 14, 2025	Incheon	South Korea	Inspire Arena	"Famous"; "Wicked"	
2025 MAMA Awards	November 29, 2025	Hong Kong	China	Kai Tak Stadium	"Famous"	
10th Asia Artist Awards	December 6, 2025	Kaohsiung	Taiwan	Kaohsiung National Stadium	"Famous"; "One More Time"	
2025 Melon Music Awards	December 20, 2025	Seoul	South Korea	Gocheok Sky Dome	"One More Time"; "Look at Me"; "Famous"	
40th Golden Disc Awards	January 10, 2026	Taipei	Taiwan	Taipei Dome	"Famous"; "Look at Me"; "One More Time"	

== Accolades ==
=== Awards and nominations ===
Name of the award ceremony, year presented, category, nominee(s) of the award, and the result of the nomination
Award ceremony	Year	Category	Nominee(s)	Result	Ref.
Asia Artist Awards	2025	Rookie of the Year – Singer	AllDay Project	Won	
Asia Artist Awards	2025	Best Artist – Singer	AllDay Project	Won	
Asia Artist Awards	2025	New Wave Award – Singer	AllDay Project	Won	
Brand Customer Loyalty Awards	2026	Mixed Group	AllDay Project	Won	
D Awards	2026	Dreams Silver Label	AllDay Project	Won	
The Fact Music Awards	2025	Next Leader Award	AllDay Project	Won	
Golden Disc Awards	2026	Rookie Artist of the Year	AllDay Project	Won	
Golden Disc Awards	2026	Digital Song Bonsang	"Famous"	Won	
Golden Disc Awards	2026	Digital Daesang (Song of the Year)	"Famous"	Nominated	
Golden Disc Awards	2026	Most Popular Artist – Female	AllDay Project	Nominated	
Hanteo Music Awards	2025	Rookie of the Year	AllDay Project	Nominated	
Hanteo Music Awards	2025	Best Continent Artist – Africa	AllDay Project	Nominated	
Hanteo Music Awards	2025	Best Continent Artist – Asia	AllDay Project	Nominated	
Hanteo Music Awards	2025	Best Continent Artist – Europe	AllDay Project	Nominated	
Hanteo Music Awards	2025	Best Continent Artist – North America	AllDay Project	Nominated	
Hanteo Music Awards	2025	Best Continent Artist – Oceania	AllDay Project	Nominated	
Hanteo Music Awards	2025	Best Continent Artist – South America	AllDay Project	Nominated	
Hanteo Music Awards	2025	Best Popular Artist	AllDay Project	Nominated	
Hanteo Music Awards	2025	Best Global Popular Artist	AllDay Project	Nominated	
iHeartRadio Music Awards	2026	Best New Artist (K-pop)	AllDay Project	Nominated	
Korea First Brand Awards	2026	Mixed Group	AllDay Project	Won	
Korea Grand Music Awards	2025	IS Rising Star	AllDay Project	Won	
Korea Grand Music Awards	2025	Grand Honor's Choice (Daesang)	AllDay Project	Won	
Korea Grand Music Awards	2025	Best Artist 10	AllDay Project	Nominated	
Korea Grand Music Awards	2025	Best Hip-Hop	"Wicked"	Nominated	
MAMA Awards	2025	Best New Artist	AllDay Project	Nominated	
MAMA Awards	2025	Fans' Choice Top 10 – Female	AllDay Project	Nominated	
MAMA Awards	2025	Song of the Year	"Famous"	Nominated	
MAMA Awards	2025	Best Music Video	"Famous"	Nominated	
MAMA Awards	2025	Best Choreography	"Wicked"	Nominated	
MAMA Awards	2025	Breakthrough Artist	AllDay Project	Won	
Melon Music Awards	2025	Top 10 Artist	AllDay Project	Nominated	
Melon Music Awards	2025	New Artist of the Year	AllDay Project	Won	
Melon Music Awards	2025	Best Music Style	AllDay Project	Won	
Melon Music Awards	2025	Berriz Global Fans' Choice	AllDay Project	Nominated	
Mint Awards	2025	Phenomenon of the Year	AllDay Project	Won	
TMElive International Music Awards	2026	Best New International Group	AllDay Project	Won	

=== Listicles ===
Key
‡	Indicates a sole placement listicle

Name of publisher, year listed, name of listicle, and placement
Publisher	Year	Listicle	Placement	Ref.
Forbes Korea	2025	K-Idol of the Year 30	30th	
IZM	2025	‡ Newcomer of the Year	Placed	
