= CoCo (O. T. Genasis song) =

Single by O.T. Genasis
- Released: October 27, 2014
- Genre: Gangsta rap; trap
- Length: 4:00
- Label: Conglomerate; Atlantic
- Songwriters: Odis Flores; Shakur Thomas
- Producer: Juice 808

O.T. Genasis singles chronology
| "Touchdown (Remix)" (2014) | "CoCo" (2014) | "The Flyest" (2015) |

"CoCo", sometimes referred to as "I'm in Love with the Coco", is a song by American rapper O.T. Genasis. It was released as a single on October 27, 2014, by Conglomerate Records and on November 10, 2014, by Atlantic Records. The song's title and lyrical content explicitly refer to Genasis' love of cocaine. It was produced by Juice 808. The song was certified Platinum by the Recording Industry Association of America (RIAA) February 26, 2016, for selling over 1,000,000 digital copies in the United States.

Upon its release, the song noted a commercial success, peaking at number 20 on the US Billboard Hot 100 and number five on the Hot R&B/Hip-Hop Songs chart.

== Music video ==
The music video for the song was released on October 13, 2014. The music video has O.T. Genasis and a few of his friends scraping together and bagging baking soda. Another video with a higher budget was released, dubbed the TV version, which features O.T. Genasis on a boat with a theme of drug cartels and the large-scale importation of cocaine. The music video features a (Conglomerate Records) sign in the beginning. The video was co-directed by Busta Rhymes (Conglomerate C.E.O). It also features cameo appearances by Director Busta Rhymes, DJ Khaled, Timbaland, Ice-T and his wife, Nicole "Coco" Austin. The TV version was filmed in Miami.

== Remixes ==
The first part of the remix entitled "CoCo (Part 2)" was released on February 10, 2015, featuring Meek Mill and Jeezy. Another remix entitled "CoCo (Part 3)" was released on February 12 and features Chris Brown. Rapper Lil Wayne remixed the song for his Sorry 4 the Wait 2 mixtape which spawned a great deal of controversy. Rappers Pitbull and J Balvin remixed the song as well. EDM remixes have been made by Makj, Flosstradamus, Borgore, Jauz, DJ Sliink, Big O, Coucheron, Mike Candys, among others. In addition, English singer Ed Sheeran performed an acoustic guitar cover of the song, which has subsequently been remixed as well.

== Charts ==
=== Weekly charts ===
Weekly chart performance for "CoCo"
| Chart (2014–2015) | Peak position |
|---|---|
| Belgium (Ultratop 50 Flanders) | 16 |
| Belgium Urban (Ultratop Flanders) | 5 |
| Belgium (Ultratop 50 Wallonia) | 22 |
| Canada Hot 100 (Billboard) | 37 |
| France (SNEP) | 23 |
| Netherlands (Single Tip) | 7 |
| Switzerland (Schweizer Hitparade) | 64 |
| UK Streaming (OCC) | 60 |
| UK Video Streaming (OCC) | 27 |
| UK Hip Hop/R&B (OCC) | 21 |
| US Billboard Hot 100 | 20 |
| US Hot R&B/Hip-Hop Songs (Billboard) | 5 |
| US Rhythmic Airplay (Billboard) | 28 |

=== Year-end charts ===
Annual chart rankings for "CoCo"
| Chart (2015) | Position |
|---|---|
| Belgium (Ultratop Flanders) | 71 |
| Belgium (Ultratop Wallonia) | 87 |
| France (SNEP) | 92 |
| US Billboard Hot 100 | 79 |

== Certifications ==
Certifications and sales for "CoCo"
| Region | Certification | Certified units/sales |
|---|---|---|
| United States (RIAA) | 2× Platinum | 2,000,000^{‡} |
^{‡} Sales+streaming figures based on certification alone.
