= Cut It =

2015 single by O.T. Genasis featuring Young Dolph

Single by O.T. Genasis featuring Young Dolph

from the album Rhythm & Bricks
- Released: September 25, 2015
- Recorded: 2015
- Genre: Hip hop; trap
- Length: 3:42
- Label: Conglomerate; Atlantic
- Songwriters: Odis Flores; Adolph Thornton Jr.; Montre Edmonds
- Producer: ITrezBeats

O.T. Genasis singles chronology
"Do It" (2015)	"Cut It" (2015)	"Push It" (2016)

Young Dolph singles chronology
"California" (2015)	"Cut It" (2015)	"Bling Blaww Burr" (2016)

"Cut It" is a song by American rapper O.T. Genasis featuring fellow American rapper Young Dolph. Produced by ITrezBeats, the song was released on September 25, 2015 by Conglomerate and Atlantic Records, as a single from O.T.'s mixtape Rhythm & Bricks. The song was certified double platinum by the Recording Industry Association of America (RIAA) on August 3, 2017, for selling over 2,000,000 digital copies in the United States.

== Music video ==
The song's accompanying music video premiered on October 9, 2015 on O.T. Genasis's YouTube account. Since its release, the music video has received over 220 million views on YouTube.

== Live performances ==
In 2016 Young Dolph performed his hit single "Cut It" live at the Royal South Central in Atlanta along with Solo Lucci and more to promote his debut album "King of Memphis". The performance was filmed by StayOnGrindTV's Director LookImHD.

== Commercial performance ==
"Cut It" debuted at number 94 on the US Billboard Hot 100 for the chart dated March 12, 2016 and eventually peaked at number 35, becoming O.T. Genasis's second top 40 hit, after his song "CoCo", which peaked at number 20 in 2014. The song also became Young Dolph's first top 40 entry. "Cut It" was certified platinum by the RIAA on November 17, 2016 and 2x platinum on August 3, 2017.

== Remixes ==
The official remix entitled "Cut It Remix: Part One" features Young Thug and Kevin Gates. The second remix entitled "Cut It Remix: Part Two" features Lil Wayne and T.I.

== Charts ==
=== Weekly charts ===
Chart (2016)	Peak position
Canada Hot 100 (Billboard)	84
US Billboard Hot 100	35
US Hot R&B/Hip-Hop Songs (Billboard)	11

=== Year-end charts ===
Chart (2016)	Position
US Billboard Hot 100	91
US Hot R&B/Hip-Hop Songs (Billboard)	32

== Certifications ==
Region	Certification	Certified units/sales
United States (RIAA)	2× Platinum	2,000,000^{‡}
^{‡} Sales+streaming figures based on certification alone.
