= Bailey Sok =

American dancer, choreographer, singer and rapper (born 2004)

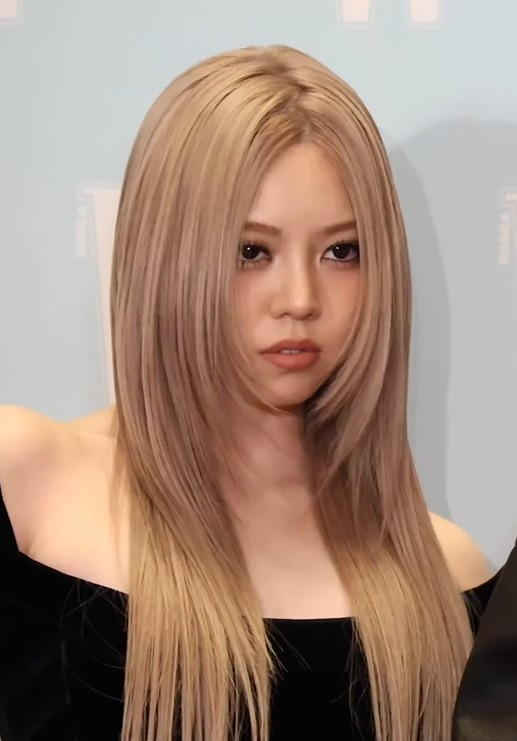
- Sok in October 2025
- Born: Bailey Drew Sok; February 24, 2004 (age 22); Placentia, California, U.S.
- Other name: Sok Yu-jin
- Occupations: Dancer; choreographer; singer; rapper
- Years active: 2010–present
- Musical career
- Origin: Seoul, South Korea
- Genre: K-pop
- Years active: 2025–present
- Label: The Black Label
- Member of: AllDay Project

Korean name
- Hangul: 석유진
- RR: Seok Yujin
- MR: Sŏk Yujin

Signature
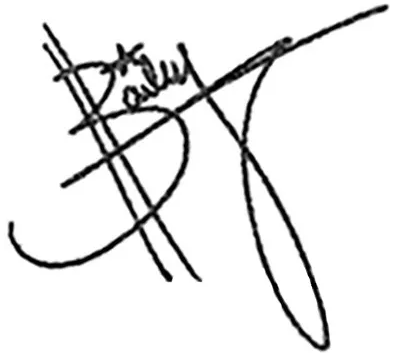

Bailey Drew Sok (/beɪli druː sɒk/; born February 24, 2004), known mononymously as Bailey (Korean: 베일리), is an American professional dancer, choreographer, singer, songwriter and rapper based in South Korea. Born and raised in Orange County, California, Sok began dancing at two and a half years old, and became a dance teacher and choreographer by age fourteen. As a musician, she debuted as a member of AllDay Project, a co-ed group under The Black Label.

== Early life ==
Bailey Drew Sok was born on February 24, 2004, in Placentia, Orange County, California, to Korean parents. Her Korean name is Sok Yu-jin (Korean: 석유진). Sok's two older sisters, who were actively involved in dance, introduced her to music and movement from an early age. Inspired by her sisters' involvement in the art, Sok began dancing at two and a half years old. Following a recommendation from the director of her sisters' dance studio, her parents enrolled her in formal lessons, where she trained in classical styles such as jazz, ballet, contemporary and tap, under Molly Long. By the age of five, she was attending summer intensives in Los Angeles taught by Matt Steffanina.

As her professional commitments increased, Sok transitioned to homeschooling in eighth grade.

== Career ==
=== 2010–2024: Career beginnings ===
Between the ages of six and ten, Sok actively participated in dance competitions before shifting to hip-hop. Her early recognition came when several of her performances gained attention on YouTube, namely her dance performance from the KAR Dance Competition, which amassed millions of views overnight. As her online presence grew, she later became a TikTok sensation. Expanding her competitive experience, Sok performed with the all-girl dance group Buns & Roses on Season 9 of America's Got Talent, and SRANK in 2018. Shortly after, she competed alongside Kida the Great in Season 4 of NBC's World of Dance.

By fourteen, she was teaching dance internationally, leading classes across the United States, Australia, France, Portugal, Japan, Korea, China, and Poland. Her growing expertise led to collaborations with prominent artists, including Janet Jackson, Jason Derulo, Meghan Trainor, and Marshmello, and became the youngest instructor at the 2019 Fair Play Dance Camp in Kraków. Further establishing herself in the dance industry, she was among four dancers selected to choreograph "Pop/Stars", the debut single of League of Legends' virtual K-pop girl group, K/DA. At fifteen, she worked alongside dancer Mina Myong to choreograph Red Velvet’s lead single, "Psycho", marking the beginning of her career in K-pop choreography. Since then, she has worked on routines for various artists, including: Taemin's "Idea", Aespa's "Savage", Kai's "Peaches", and Taeyang's "Shoong".

=== 2025–present: Debut with AllDay Project ===
In February 2024, a series of leaked photos of The Black Label trainees, later revealed to be members of the agency's girl group Meovv, quickly circulated online. The content, which garnered widespread attention, prominently included Ella Gross, Annie Moon, and Sok. Although she did not debut with the act she did choreograph for them, she later was formally introduced as a member of AllDay Project in June 2025, a five-member co-ed ensemble under the same company.

== Artistry ==
=== Dance style and approach ===
Bailey Sok's approach to dance is shaped by her emotions and experiences, allowing her to interpret music through movement in a dynamic and expressive manner. Her choreography is deeply connected to the energy of the moment—whether driven by excitement and rhythm inspired by '90s hip-hop or influenced by a more reflective state, drawing from the smooth, understated tones of jazz and lo-fi. Each performance serves as a direct translation of sound into motion, demonstrating precision, fluidity, and adaptability.

Her versatility stems from a diverse training background, which includes classical styles such as ballet and jazz, as well as hip-hop and open-style choreography. This foundation has enabled her to develop musicality, body control, and the ability to execute intricate movements with precision. Sok's approach emphasizes attention to detail, ensuring that every beat, transition, and nuance is reflected in her performance. Her ability to blend various dance styles has contributed to her distinctive presence in the industry, making her choreography both dynamic and technically refined.

=== Influence ===
Sok named 2NE1, Big Bang, and Girls' Generation as the artists she listened to growing up. She describes their music as "electrifying and full of energy", which shaped her passion for dancing and performing.

Reham Rafiq, a Pakistani dancer, credits Sok as an influence.

== Other ventures ==
=== Endorsements ===
Sok has been endorsed by brand campaigns belonging to Samsung and Nike, and collaborated with Spotify and Roblox on its "Spotify Island's K-Park" project.

== Choreography credits ==
Year	Artist	Song	Album	Ref.
2018	Denim Nicole	"Lemonade"	Non-album single	
2018	K/DA	"Pop/Stars"	Non-album single	
2019	Wengie	"Empire" (featuring Minnie of (G)I-dle)	Non-album single	
2019	Red Velvet	"Psycho"	The ReVe Festival: Finale	
2020	Taemin	"Idea" (이데아; 理想)	Never Gonna Dance Again	
2021	Shinee	"Don't Call Me"	Don't Call Me	
2021	Aespa	"Savage"	Savage	
2021	Kai	"Peaches"	Peaches	
2022	Aespa	"Illusion"	Girls	
2023	Taeyang	"Vibe"	Down to Earth	
2023	Taeyang	"Shoong!"	Down to Earth	
2023	Aespa	"Spicy"	My World	
2023	Jeon Somi	"Gold Gold Gold"	Game Plan	
2024	Meovv	"Meow"	My Eyes Open VVide	
2024	Meovv	"Body"	My Eyes Open VVide	
2025	AllDay Project	"Famous"	Famous	
2025	AllDay Project	"Wicked"	Famous	

== Filmography ==
=== Film ===
Year	Title	Role	Ref.
2019	Zoe Valentine	Vivi Anderson	
2024	Dance Rivals	Lucky	

=== Television shows ===
Year	Title	Role	Notes	Ref.
2014	America's Got Talent season 9	Contestant	as Buns and Roses	
2016	Dance Video Throwdown	Contestant	—N/a	
2017	Dance-Off Juniors	Contestant	—N/a	
2018	World of Dance season 2	Contestant	as S-Rank	
2020	World of Dance season 4	Contestant	with Kida Burns	
2021	Truth Be Told Season 2 Episodes 3 & 6	Sponsor Kid		

=== Music video appearances ===
Year	Song title	Artist	Ref.
2020	"Poppin" (featuring Lil Pump and Smokepurpp)	KSI	
2020	"Drum Go Dum" (featuring Aluna, Wolftyla and Bekuh Boom)	K/DA	
2022	"She's All I Wanna Be"	Tate McRae	
2022	"Cruel"	Jackson Wang	

== Discography ==
=== Singles ===
List of singles, showing year released, and name of the album
Title	Year	Album
"Can't Kill Me"	2026	Non-album single

=== Songwriting credits ===
All song credits are adapted from the Korea Music Copyright Association's database unless stated otherwise.

List of songs, showing year released, artist name, and name of the album
Title	Year	Artist(s)	Album	Lyricist	Composer
"Wicked"	2025	AllDay Project	Famous	Yes	No
"One More Time"	2025	AllDay Project	AllDay Project	Yes	Yes
"Look at Me"	2025	AllDay Project	AllDay Project	Yes	No
"Hot" (Tarzzan and Bailey)	2025	AllDay Project	AllDay Project	Yes	No
"I Don't Bargain"	2026	AllDay Project	Non-album single	Yes	No
"Can't Kill Me"	2026	Bailey	Non-album single	Yes	No
"Talk"	2026	AllDay Project	Crash	Yes	No
"Crash"	2026	AllDay Project	Crash	Yes	No
"Do It Like This"	2026	AllDay Project	Crash	Yes	No
"No Limit"	2026	AllDay Project	Crash	Yes	No
"Up All Night"	2026	AllDay Project	Crash	Yes	No

== Awards and nominations ==
Name of the award ceremony, year presented, award category, nominee(s) of the award, and the result of the nomination
Award ceremony	Year	Category	Nominee(s) / Work(s)	Result	Ref.
Adweek Creator Visionary Awards	2023	Dance Creator of the Year	Bailey Sok	Won	
Arena Awards	2019	Rising Star of the Year	Bailey Sok	Won	
Choreo Awards	2025	Star Dance of the Year	Bailey Sok	Nominated	
Industry Dance Awards	2017	Favorite Dancer 17 & Under	Bailey Sok	Nominated	
World Choreography Awards	2022	Digital Content Independent	"Somebody That I Used To Know"	Nominated	
