= O. T. Genasis =

American rapper (born 1987)

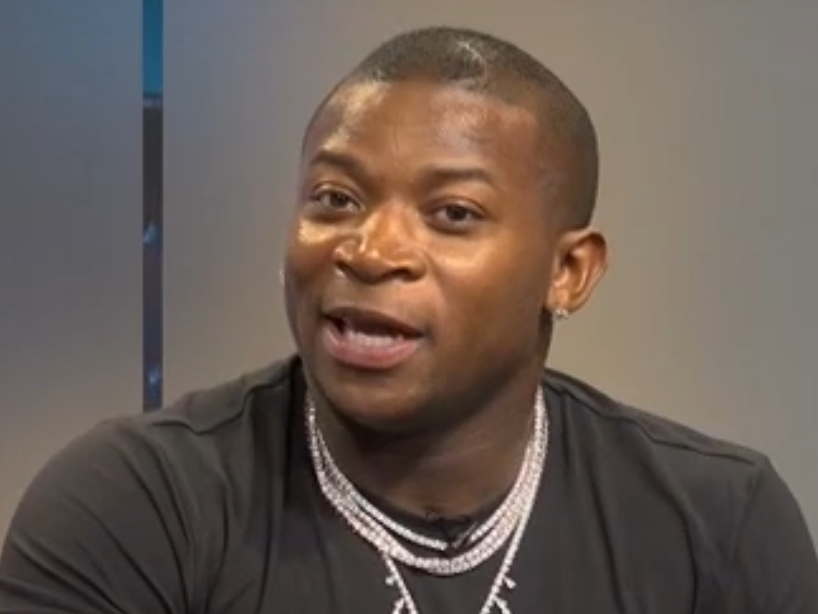
- Flores in 2018

Background information
- Born: Odis Oliver Flores; June 18, 1987 (age 39); Long Beach, California, U.S.
- Genre: Hip-hop
- Occupation: Rapper
- Years active: 2011–present
- Labels: Fast Lyfe; Conglomerate; Atlantic

Odis Oliver Flores (born June 18, 1987), better known by his stage name O. T. Genasis, is an American rapper. Flores is best known for his 2014 single "CoCo" and its 2015 follow-up "Cut It" (featuring Young Dolph), both of which peaked within the top 40 of the Billboard Hot 100 and received double platinum certifications by the Recording Industry Association of America (RIAA).

== Early life ==
Flores was born on June 18, 1987, in Long Beach, California to Garifuna parents from Belize. Genasis states that his influences include Cutty Ranks, Buju Banton, T.I., Ludacris, 2Pac, Shabba Ranks, and 50 Cent.

== Career ==
In 2011, Flores signed with G-Unit Records. The following year, he released his untitled debut mixtape under the label. He then after parted ways with G-Unit and signed with Busta Rhymes' Conglomerate Records. He released the singles "Touchdown (Remix)" (featuring label boss Busta Rhymes and French Montana) and "CoCo" in 2014. The latter had success on the charts, peaking at number 20 on the US Billboard Hot 100. In 2018, American singer Beyoncé used his song "Everybody Mad" as part of her Coachella performance and as part of her and Jay-Z's On the Run II Tour.

In 2022, Flores' single "I Look Good" was featured prominently in the "Doin' Laps" commercial for the iPhone 13. In 2023, O.T Genasis joined the eighth season cast of The Surreal Life on MTV. The eighth season premiered on July 23, 2024.

== Personal life ==
Flores is a father to son born in 2010. In a 2016 interview with The Shade Room, he stated his son has autism. In 2020, Malika Haqq, an actress and TV personality, gave birth to his second son.

=== Dispute with Keyshia Cole ===
In December 2019, Flores released "Never Knew", which he rapped over the instrumental to and mimicked the vocal delivery of singer Keyshia Cole's 2005 single, "Love". Cole disapproved of the remake, especially on her Fox Soul talk show, One on One with Keyshia Cole, due to its gang culture. In response, both artists attacked each other online with social media posts, infamously with Flores performing the "Never Knew" remake at a Christmas party during karaoke. A music video for the remake was published on YouTube during the holiday season, but was later pulled off. The extent was pulled further as the video was later uploaded to Pornhub.

The dispute reiterated in July 2021, when Cole's mother, Frankie Lons, died, with Flores claiming he sold drugs to her in his early years, which he caused backlash for. Cole's estranged sisters and brother, respectively, Neffeteria "Neffe" Pugh, Elite Noel and Sean Cole (known as rapper Nutt-So), criticized him in response, with the former claiming to "finish him". However, Flores appeared with Cole during her performance of "Love" in the midst of her Verzuz competition against former Ja Rule protege Ashanti, which both Pugh and Noel still disapproved.

Though their dispute died down afterwards, Flores publicly apologized to Cole once again when on April 1, 2024, he appeared on-stage during a concert in Los Angeles. He said of her to the audience, "When I met this woman, she is the sweetest, one of the greatest personalities, the greatest sense of humor, she’s really sent from God. She got a very, very, very good soul." In response, she consequentially called the rapper a "ninja turtle" for his past remarks about her mother. Flores and Cole both claimed love for each other and embraced, squashing their feud. Cole's sisters, Neffe Pugh and Elite Noel, however, still disapproved of Flores' apology, with the latter saying via social media, "Ho, go kiss my [mother]'s grave and then I'll forgive you." [sic], with Cole (the following day) understanding her siblings' rights to their feelings, while adding "I chose differently with forgiveness. It all happened publicly so he apologized publicly."

== Discography ==
=== Mixtapes ===
List of mixtapes, with year released
Title	Album details
Black Belt	Released: June 13, 2012; Label: G-Unit
Catastrophic 2 (with Busta Rhymes and J-Doe)	Released: August 7, 2014; Label: Conglomerate
Rhythm & Bricks	Released: September 22, 2015; Label: Conglomerate
Coke N Butter	Released: November 11, 2016; Label: Atlantic

=== Singles ===
==== As lead artist ====
List of singles, with selected chart positions and certifications, showing year released and album name
Title	Year	Peak chart positions							Certification	Album
Title	Year	US	US R&B/HH	US Rap	CAN	FRA	SWI	UK	Certification	Album
"Touchdown"	2014	—	—	—	—	—	—	—		Non-album singles
"CoCo"	2014	20	5	4	37	23	64	192	RIAA: 2× Platinum	Non-album singles
"The Flyest"	2015	—	—	—	—	—	—	—		Non-album singles
"Ricky"	2015	—	—	—	—	—	—	—		Rhythm & Bricks
"O.V. (It's Over)" (featuring Trae tha Truth and K Camp)	2015	—	—	—	—	—	—	—		Non-album single
"Do It" (featuring Lil Wayne)	2015	—	—	—	—	—	—	—		Rhythm & Bricks
"Cut It" (featuring Young Dolph)	2015	35	11	6	84	—	—	—	RIAA: 2× Platinum	Rhythm & Bricks
"Push It"	2016	— (Note: "Push It" did not enter the Billboard Hot 100, but peaked at number 14 on the Bubbling Under Hot 100 Singles chart.)	— (Note: "Push It" did not enter the Billboard Hot R&B/Hip-Hop Songs chart, but peaked at number one on the Bubbling Under R&B/Hip-Hop Singles chart.)	—	—	—	—	—	RIAA: Gold	Coke N Butter
"Everybody Mad"	2017	—	—	—	—	—	—	—		Non-album singles
"Bae"	2018	—	—	—	—	—	—	—		Non-album singles
"I Look Good"	2019	—	—	—	—	—	—	—		Non-album singles
"Back to You" (featuring Chris Brown and Charlie Wilson)	2020	—	—	—	—	—	—	—		Non-album singles
"—" denotes a recording that did not chart or was not released in that territory.

==== Guest appearances ====
List of all guest appearances, with other performing artists, showing year released and album name
Title	Year	Artist(s)	Album
"Dope Boy"	2016	Mustard, Jeezy	Cold Summer
"All on Me"	2017	Mally Mall, Maejor	Mally's World, Vol. 1
"No Tomorrow"	2017	Afrojack, Belly, Ricky Breaker	—N/a
"3's Company"	2017	Snoop Dogg, Chris Brown	Make America Crip Again
"Been Hot"	2017	RJ, DJ Mustard	The Ghetto
"Thirty"	2017	Shawty Lo	R.I.C.O.
"Full Time Trappa"	2018	King Los, Yo Gotti	The 410 Survival Kit
"Bring It Out"	2018	DJ Esco, Future	Kolorblind
"Gotta Get It"	2018	Dax	It's Different Now
"A Million Times"	2019	T-Pain	1UP
"Savior"	2019	PFV	Perfect Vision
"T.O."	2020	Lil Wayne	Funeral
"Show Me What You Got"	2020	Lil Keed	Trapped on Cleveland 3 (Deluxe)
"Okanemochi"	2022	JP the Wavy, Bankroll Got It, Lex	Bankroll Wavy
"Lightning"	2024	Kristii, Chris Brown	—N/a

== See also ==
- List of Afro-Latinos
