= Co-ed group =

Vocal group that includes both female and male singers

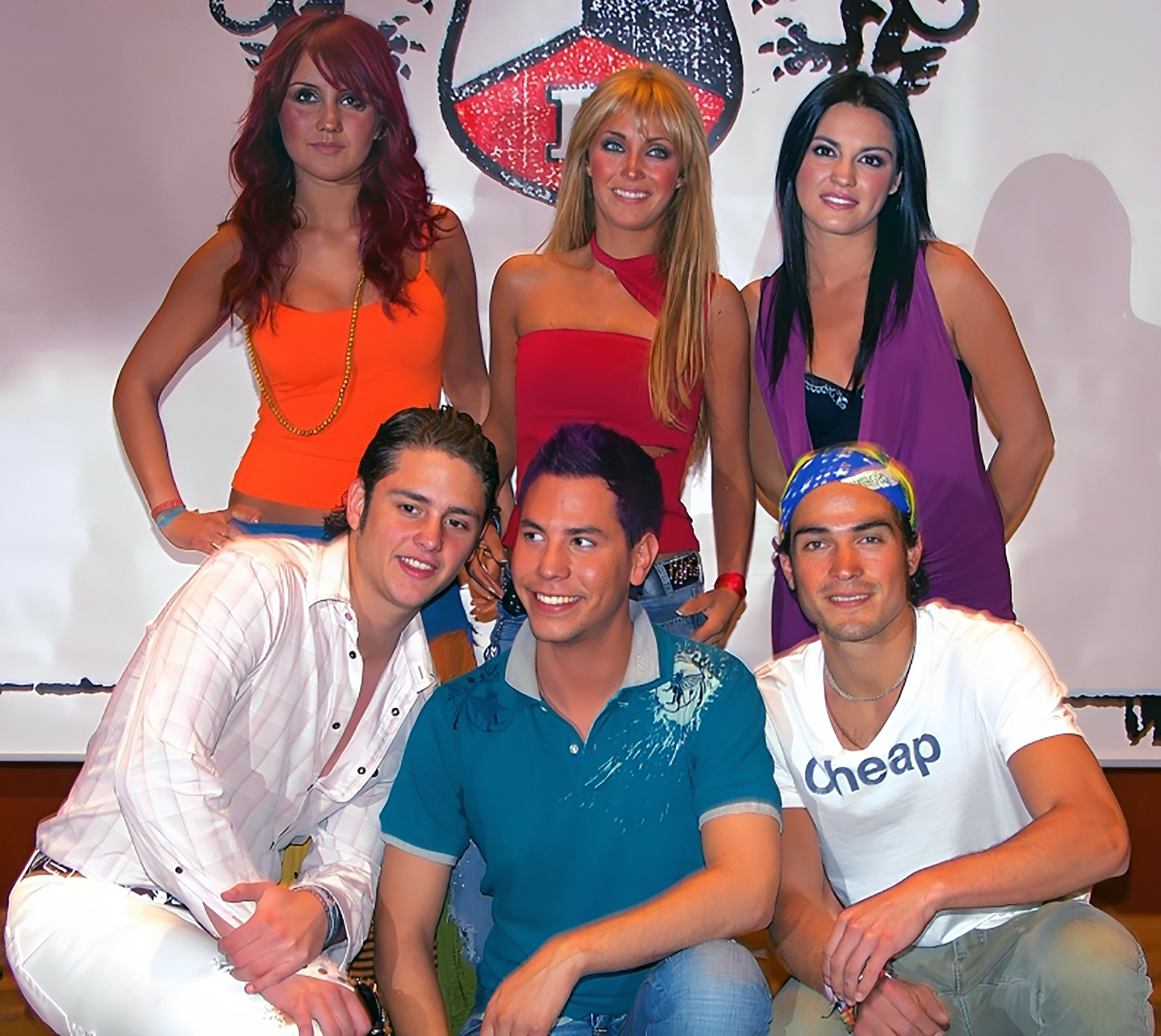
RBD are described as a pop co-ed group

A co-ed group, also known as a coed group, mixed-gender group or mixed-sex group, is a vocal group that includes both male and female singers, usually in their teenage years or in their twenties.

Historically, co-ed groups have not been as common in pop music as girl groups and boy groups. Music industry pundits have pointed out that such groups are difficult to market to the typical target demographic of teen pop acts, namely pre-teen and teen girls. According to music writer Jake Austen, girl groups and boy group appeal to young girls in distinct ways, with girl groups marketed as role models and boy groups marketed as objects of desire, and mixing the two is "unnecessarily confusing". Slate's Dann Halem echoed this sentiment, adding that "it's hard to croon convincingly about the pop world's staple subject—teen-age yearning and heartache—if you're harmonizing with the object of your affection."

== Asia ==
In Asia, co-ed groups are not as popular as girl groups and boy groups, and as a result, there are comparatively few groups of this style.

In South Korea, mixed-gender groups were more common in the 1990s, with successful first-generation groups including Koyote, Roo'ra, Sharp, and Cool. However, since the 2000s, co-ed groups have become comparatively less common than girl groups and boy bands, with few recent groups finding varying levels of success such as AKMU, Kard, and AllDay Project. In his analysis of the K-pop phenomenon, sociologist John Lie attributes this lack of co-ed groups to the "accentuation of gender archetypes" that has "solidified the practice of creating single-sex groups". Author Roald Maliangkay concluded that: "The commercial appeal of [their visual] presentation with a specific, targetable male or female audience helps to explain why, even today, mixed-sex non-uniform K-pop groups are virtually non-existent."

In Japan, AAA has been described as "a rare commodity in J-pop in that they are a mixed-sex group aimed at both female teenagers and male music fans", but they are not the only examples. Others include Folder, which was a short-lived co-ed group in the late '90s, that released two albums before the two boys left and the group was renamed Folder 5, while lol is a later example that debuted in 2015.

In Thailand, there are some similar groups like 3.2.1, which debuted in 2010.

== Europe ==
While mixed gender teen pop groups have not had much success in the United States, several mixed-gender groups have enjoyed success in Europe in the early 2000s, particularly in Scandinavia and the UK. Notable examples include Aqua, Vengaboys, S Club 7, A-Teens, Hear'Say, Ace of Base, Steps, KidToniK, A Touch of Class, and Liberty X. Music writer Jake Austen theorised that the success of these groups in the UK can be attributed to the British public's acceptance of the "disposability of pop acts".

== Latin America ==
Co-ed groups are known in Latin America as "grupos mixtos" or "bandas mixtas", which literally means "mixed bands". Many of these groups came from soap operas, series and programs with musical themes. Mexico was the country that most launched groups like this one to the market. From Mexico, the most famous groups of this kind were: Timbiriche, Fresas con Crema, Kabah, OV7, RBD and Garibaldi. From South America the most notable groups between early 2000s to 2010 were: Erreway, Teen Angels and Kudai.

There is a new generation of co-ed groups in Latin America, with groups like LemonGrass and MIX5.

LemonGrass is the new Mexican musical group that already aims to become the successor of OV7. It is composed of seven small singers and dancers discovered in 2015 by Ari Borovoy, and they are already playing with their first single "Mi mundo gira contigo". In 2016, they released their single 'Vértigo', a Spanish version of the Korean song 'Bar Bar Bar' by girl group 'Crayon Pop'.

MIX5 was the winning band of the reality show 'La Banda 2016'. This group is formed by two girls and three boys of different nationalities.

== See also ==
- Mixed-gender band
