= List of awards and nominations received by Blackpink =

Blackpink awards and nominations
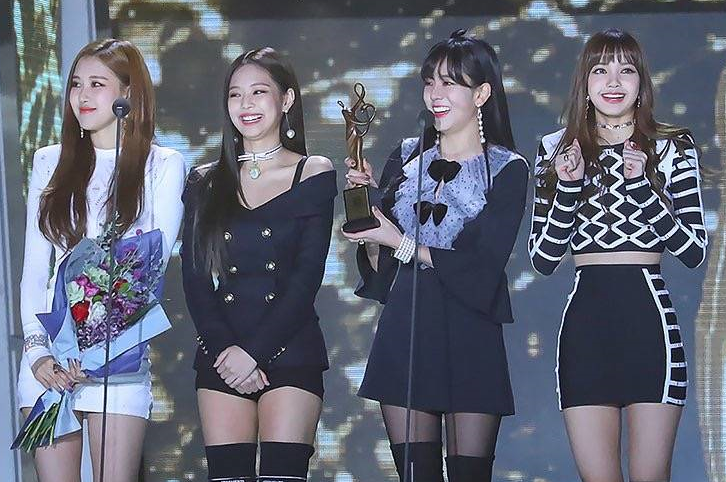
- Blackpink at the 27th Seoul Music Awards in January 2018
Awards and nominations
Award	Wins	Nominations
American Music Awards	0	2
Anugerah Bintang Popular Berita Harian	0	1
APAN Music Awards	2	6
Asia Artist Awards	4	16
Asia Star Entertainer Awards	1	2
Asian Pop Music Awards	10	18
Billboard Music Awards	1	2
Brand Customer Loyalty Awards	0	1
Brand of the Year Awards	1	1
Bravo Otto	4	4
BreakTudo Awards	11	30
Brit Awards	0	1
Bugs Music Awards	1	1
Capricho Awards	1	5
Circle Chart Music Awards	14	23
Clio Awards	2	2
D Awards	0	2
Elle Style Awards	1	1
The Fact Music Awards	0	3
Genie Music Awards	0	15
Golden Disc Awards	8	26
Hallyu K Fans' Choice Awards	2	2
Hanteo Music Awards	2	7
iHeartRadio Music Awards	1	13
Japan Gold Disc Award	1	1
Joox Hong Kong Top Music Awards	1	1
Joox Indonesia Music Awards	0	3
Joox Thailand Music Awards	1	5
K-World Dream Awards	1	13
KM Chart Awards	0	3
Korea First Brand Awards	1	1
Korea Grand Music Awards	1	6
Korea Popular Music Awards	0	4
MAMA Awards	11	47
Melon Music Awards	5	28
Meus Prêmios Nick	0	8
MTV Europe Music Awards	1	10
MTV MIAW Awards	1	4
MTV MIAW Awards Brazil	2	6
MTV Video Music Awards	5	17
MTV Video Music Awards Japan	2	3
Music Awards Japan	1	3
Nickelodeon Kids' Choice Awards	0	8
Nickelodeon Mexico Kids' Choice Awards	0	6
NRJ Music Awards	0	2
People's Choice Awards	3	7
Philippine K-pop Awards	1	1
QQ Music Boom Boom Awards	1	1
RTHK International Pop Poll Awards	3	3
SEC Awards	1	4
Seoul Music Awards	4	29
Seoul Success Awards	1	1
Shorty Awards	1	1
Soompi Awards	2	3
Spotify Awards	1	1
Teen Choice Awards	1	7
Telehit Awards	0	1
Tencent Music Entertainment Awards	2	2
TMElive International Music Awards	1	1
Tokopedia WIB Indonesia K-pop Awards	1	1
V Live Awards	4	6
Variety Hitmakers Awards	1	1
Webby Awards	1	1
Weibo Starlight Awards	1	1
YouTube Creator Awards	2	2

Totals (Note: Certain award groups do not simply award one winner. They acknowledge several different recipients, have runners-up, and have third place. Since this is a specific recognition and is different from losing an award, runner-up mentions are considered wins in this award tally. For simplification and to avoid errors, each award in this list has been presumed to have had a prior nomination.)
- Wins: 132
- Nominations: 432

Blackpink is a South Korean girl group formed by YG Entertainment, consisting of members Jisoo, Jennie, Rosé, and Lisa. Their debut single album Square One and its follow-up Square Two, released in August and November 2016 respectively, won the group New Artist of the Year awards at the 31st Golden Disc Awards, the 2016 Melon Music Awards, the 26th Seoul Music Awards, the 1st Asia Artist Awards, and the 6th Gaon Chart Music Awards. At the latter, Square One single "Whistle" won Artist of the Year – Digital Music (August), while the Square Two single "Playing with Fire" won the award for November. "Whistle" also won Best Music Video at the 2016 Mnet Asian Music Awards.

Blackpink's next two singles "As If It's Your Last" and "Ddu-Du Ddu-Du" both won the Best Digital Song bonsang (Note: A bonsang (Korean: 본상), which translates to "main prize", is a major award given at a South Korean award ceremony to multiple artists.) at the 32nd and 33rd Golden Disc Awards respectively. "Ddu-Du Ddu-Du", the lead single from their first extended play Square Up (2018), also won the Best Dance – Female award at the 2018 Melon Music Awards, Artist of the Year – Digital Music (June) at the 8th Gaon Chart Music Awards, and Choice Song: Group at the 2019 Teen Choice Awards. "Kill This Love", the lead single from their second extended play Kill This Love (2019), won the Music Video of 2019 at the 45th People's Choice Awards, where Blackpink was additionally awarded the Group of 2019 and the Concert Tour of 2019 for the In Your Area World Tour.

Blackpink's first studio album The Album (2020) won the Best Album bonsang at the 35th Golden Disc Awards, while the lead single "How You Like That" won the Best Digital Song bonsang. The song garnered Blackpink their first ever Guinness World Records, five in total, including for the most-viewed video on YouTube in 24 hours. It won Best Dance (Female Group) awards at the 2020 Melon Music Awards and the 2020 Mnet Asian Music Awards as well as the MTV Music Video Award for Song of Summer, making them the first K-pop girl group to win an MTV VMA. "How You Like That" and "Lovesick Girls" from The Album won Artist of the Year – Digital Music for June and October respectively at the 10th Gaon Chart Music Awards. Blackpink also won Best Female Group at the 2020 Mnet Asian Music Awards and was selected by Variety as its 2020 Hitmakers Group of the Year. In 2021, Blackpink earned their sixth Guinness World Record for having the most subscribers for a music artist on YouTube. In 2022, the group earned the MTV Video Music Award and the MTV Europe Music Award for Best Metaverse Performance with their in-game concert Blackpink: The Virtual on PUBG Mobile; the group also won a Guinness World Record for being the inaugural winner of the category at the MTV Video Music Awards.

Blackpink's second studio album Born Pink (2022) won the Best Album bonsang at the 37th Golden Disc Awards and topped the US and UK album charts upon release, earning Blackpink two Guinness World Records as the first K-pop girl group to do so. The lead single "Pink Venom" won Best Music Video at the 2022 MAMA Awards, while Blackpink won Best Female Group at the ceremony as well. "Pink Venom" and "Shut Down" from Born Pink won Artist of the Year – Global Digital Music for August and September respectively at the 12th Circle Chart Music Awards, at which Blackpink was also awarded the Female Group of the Year. In 2023, Blackpink became the first Korean girl group to be recognized by the Brit Awards with their nomination for Best International Group, and received two further Guinness World Records for being the most-streamed female group on Spotify and the most-viewed music channel for a group on YouTube. At the 2023 MTV Video Music Awards, Blackpink was awarded Best Choreography for "Pink Venom" as well as Group of the Year, making them the first girl group to win the latter award in the 21st century. Blackpink won Top K-Pop Touring Artist at the 2023 Billboard Music Awards, becoming one of the first Korean girl groups to win a Billboard Music Award. At the 2025 MTV Video Music Awards, Blackpink won Best Group for a second time. "Jump", the lead single from their third extended play Deadline (2026), won the daesang (Note: A daesang (Korean: 대상), which translates to "grand prize", is the highest honor given out at South Korean music award ceremonies in recognition of the artist(s) with the greatest physical and digital achievements for the year.) for Song of the Year at the Asia Star Entertainer Awards 2026 and the Best Digital Song bonsang at the 40th Golden Disc Awards.

== Awards and nominations ==
Name of the award ceremony, year presented, category, nominee(s) of the award, and the result of the nomination
Award ceremony	Year	Category	Nominee(s)/work(s)	Result	Ref.
American Music Awards	2022	Favorite K-Pop Artist	Blackpink	Nominated	
American Music Awards	2026	Best Female K-Pop Artist	Blackpink	Nominated	
Anugerah Bintang Popular Berita Harian	2019	Korean Popular Artist	Blackpink	Nominated	
APAN Music Awards	2021	Best Music Video	Blackpink	Won	
APAN Music Awards	2021	Idol Champ Global Pick – Group	Blackpink	Won	
APAN Music Awards	2021	APAN Top 10	Blackpink	Nominated	
APAN Music Awards	2021	Best Performance	Blackpink	Nominated	
APAN Music Awards	2021	Idol Champ Fan's Pick – Group	Blackpink	Nominated	
APAN Music Awards	2021	KT Seezn Star Award – Singer	Blackpink	Nominated	
Asia Artist Awards	2016	Rookie Singer Award	Blackpink	Won	
Asia Artist Awards	2016	Popularity Award – Singer	Blackpink	Nominated	
Asia Artist Awards	2017	Popularity Award – Singer	Blackpink	Nominated	
Asia Artist Awards	2018	Popularity Award – Singer	Blackpink	Nominated	
Asia Artist Awards	2019	Popularity Award – Singer	Blackpink	Nominated	
Asia Artist Awards	2019	StarNews Popularity Award – Female Group	Blackpink	Nominated	
Asia Artist Awards	2020	Popularity Award – Singer (Female)	Blackpink	Nominated	
Asia Artist Awards	2021	U+Idol Live Popularity Award – Female Group	Blackpink	Won	
Asia Artist Awards	2021	RET Popularity Award – Idol Group (Female)	Blackpink	Nominated	
Asia Artist Awards	2022	DCM Popularity Award – Female Singer	Blackpink	Won	
Asia Artist Awards	2022	Idolplus Popularity Award – Singer	Blackpink	Nominated	
Asia Artist Awards	2023	Popularity Award – Singer (Female)	Blackpink	Nominated	
Asia Artist Awards	2024	Popularity Award – Singer (Female)	Blackpink	Nominated	
Asia Artist Awards	2025	Legendary Group – Female	Blackpink	Won	
Asia Artist Awards	2025	Popularity Award – Group (Female)	Blackpink	Nominated	
Asia Artist Awards	2026	Popularity Award – Group (Female)	Blackpink	Pending	
Asia Star Entertainer Awards	2026	Song of the Year	"Jump"	Won	
Asia Star Entertainer Awards	2026	The Best Group (Female)	Blackpink	Nominated	
Asian Pop Music Awards	2020	Best Album (Overseas)	The Album	Won	
Asian Pop Music Awards	2020	Best Group (Overseas)	Blackpink	Won	
Asian Pop Music Awards	2020	Best Music Video (Overseas)	"Lovesick Girls"	Nominated	
Asian Pop Music Awards	2020	Song of the Year (Overseas)	"How You Like That"	Nominated	
Asian Pop Music Awards	2022	Best Album of the Year (Overseas)	Born Pink	Won	
Asian Pop Music Awards	2022	Song of the Year (Overseas)	"Pink Venom"	Won	
Asian Pop Music Awards	2022	Top 20 Songs of the Year (Overseas)	"Pink Venom"	Won	
Asian Pop Music Awards	2022	Top 20 Albums of the Year (Overseas)	Born Pink	Won	
Asian Pop Music Awards	2022	People's Choice Award (Overseas)	Born Pink	5th place	
Asian Pop Music Awards	2022	Best Dance Performance (Overseas)	"Pink Venom"	Nominated	
Asian Pop Music Awards	2022	Best Group (Overseas)	Blackpink	Nominated	
Asian Pop Music Awards	2022	Best Music Video (Overseas)	"Pink Venom"	Nominated	
Asian Pop Music Awards	2022	Record of the Year (Overseas)	"Pink Venom"	Nominated	
Asian Pop Music Awards	2023	Top 20 Songs of the Year (Overseas)	"The Girls"	Won	
Asian Pop Music Awards	2023	Song of the Year (Overseas)	"The Girls"	Nominated	
Asian Pop Music Awards	2025	Top 20 Songs of the Year	"Jump"	Won	
Asian Pop Music Awards	2025	People's Choice Award	"Jump"	8th place	
Asian Pop Music Awards	2025	Song of the Year	"Jump"	Nominated	
Billboard Music Awards	2021	Top Social Artist	Blackpink	Nominated	
Billboard Music Awards	2023	Top K-Pop Touring Artist	Blackpink	Won	
Brand Customer Loyalty Awards	2021	Best Female Idol Group	Blackpink	Nominated	
Brand of the Year Awards (Note: Established in 2003, the Brand of the Year Awards is an awards ceremony based on nationwide surveys hosted by the Korea Consumer Brand Committee and organized by the Korea Consumer Forum.)	2026	Female Idol (Indonesia)	Blackpink	Won	
Bravo Otto	2019	Best K-pop	Blackpink	Gold	
Bravo Otto	2020	Best K-pop	Blackpink	Gold	
Bravo Otto	2021	Best Band/Duo	Blackpink	Gold	
Bravo Otto	2022	Best International Singer	Blackpink	Silver	
BreakTudo Awards	2018	Favorite K-pop Group	Blackpink	Nominated	
BreakTudo Awards	2018	K-pop Female Group	Blackpink	Nominated	
BreakTudo Awards	2018	Video of the Year	"Ddu-Du Ddu-Du"	Nominated	
BreakTudo Awards	2019	Boom Video of the Year	"Kill This Love"	Won	
BreakTudo Awards	2019	Collaboration of the Year	"Kiss and Make Up" (with Dua Lipa)	Won	
BreakTudo Awards	2019	International Music Video of the Year	"Kill This Love"	Won	
BreakTudo Awards	2019	K-pop Female Group	Blackpink	Won	
BreakTudo Awards	2020	Collaboration of the Year	"Sour Candy" (with Lady Gaga)	Nominated	
BreakTudo Awards	2020	International Fandom	Blackpink	Nominated	
BreakTudo Awards	2020	International Group	Blackpink	Nominated	
BreakTudo Awards	2020	International Music Video	"How You Like That"	Nominated	
BreakTudo Awards	2020	K-pop Female Group	Blackpink	Nominated	
BreakTudo Awards	2021	International Fandom	Blackpink	Won	
BreakTudo Awards	2021	International Group	Blackpink	Won	
BreakTudo Awards	2021	International Music Video	"Lovesick Girls"	Won	
BreakTudo Awards	2021	K-pop Female Group	Blackpink	Won	
BreakTudo Awards	2022	International Music Video	"Pink Venom"	Won	
BreakTudo Awards	2022	K-pop Girl Group	Blackpink	Won	
BreakTudo Awards	2022	International Fandom	Blackpink	Nominated	
BreakTudo Awards	2022	International Group	Blackpink	Nominated	
BreakTudo Awards	2023	International Fandom of the Year	Blackpink	Won	
BreakTudo Awards	2023	International Female Group	Blackpink	Nominated	
BreakTudo Awards	2023	International Music Video	"Shut Down"	Nominated	
BreakTudo Awards	2024	International Fandom of the Year	Blackpink	Nominated	
BreakTudo Awards	2025	International Fandom of the Year	Blackpink	Nominated	
BreakTudo Awards	2025	International Female Group	Blackpink	Nominated	
BreakTudo Awards	2025	International Music Video	"Jump"	Nominated	
BreakTudo Awards	2026	International Fandom of the Year	Blackpink	Pending	
BreakTudo Awards	2026	International Female Group	Blackpink	Pending	
BreakTudo Awards	2026	International Music Video	"Go"	Pending	
Brit Awards	2023	Best International Group	Blackpink	Nominated	
Bugs Music Awards	2020	20th Anniversary Awards – Most Loved Music	"Ddu-Du Ddu-Du"	Won	
Capricho Awards	2020	Feature of the Year	"Ice Cream" (with Selena Gomez)	Nominated	
Capricho Awards	2020	International Group	Blackpink	Nominated	
Capricho Awards	2022	Group of the Year	Blackpink	Won	
Capricho Awards	2022	Fandom of the Year	Blackpink	Nominated	
Capricho Awards	2022	Hit of the Year (International)	"Pink Venom"	Nominated	
Circle Chart Music Awards	2017	Artist of the Year – Digital Music (August)	"Whistle"	Won	
Circle Chart Music Awards	2017	Artist of the Year – Digital Music (November)	"Playing with Fire"	Won	
Circle Chart Music Awards	2017	New Artist of the Year – Digital	Blackpink	Won	
Circle Chart Music Awards	2018	World New Artist Award	Blackpink	Won	
Circle Chart Music Awards	2019	Artist of the Year – Digital Music (June)	"Ddu-Du Ddu-Du"	Won	
Circle Chart Music Awards	2019	Artist of the Year – Digital Music (June)	"Forever Young"	Nominated	
Circle Chart Music Awards	2020	Artist of the Year – Digital Music (April)	"Kill This Love"	Nominated	
Circle Chart Music Awards	2020	Artist of the Year – Physical Album (2nd Quarter)	Kill This Love	Nominated	
Circle Chart Music Awards	2021	Artist of the Year – Digital Music (June)	"How You Like That"	Won	
Circle Chart Music Awards	2021	Artist of the Year – Digital Music (October)	"Lovesick Girls"	Won	
Circle Chart Music Awards	2021	Mubeat Global Choice Award – Female	Blackpink	Won	
Circle Chart Music Awards	2021	Social Hot Star of the Year	Blackpink	Won	
Circle Chart Music Awards	2021	Artist of the Year – Digital Music (August)	"Ice Cream" (with Selena Gomez)	Nominated	
Circle Chart Music Awards	2021	Artist of the Year – Physical Album (4th Quarter)	The Album	Nominated	
Circle Chart Music Awards	2023	Artist of the Year – Global Digital Music (August)	"Pink Venom"	Won	
Circle Chart Music Awards	2023	Artist of the Year – Global Digital Music (September)	"Shut Down"	Won	
Circle Chart Music Awards	2023	Female Group of the Year	Blackpink	Won	
Circle Chart Music Awards	2023	Mubeat Global Choice Award – Female	Blackpink	Won	
Circle Chart Music Awards	2023	Artist of the Year – Global Digital Music (September)	"Typa Girl"	Nominated	
Circle Chart Music Awards	2023	Artist of the Year – Global Digital Music (September)	"Hard to Love"	Nominated	
Circle Chart Music Awards	2023	Artist of the Year – Global Digital Music (September)	"The Happiest Girl"	Nominated	
Circle Chart Music Awards	2023	Artist of the Year – Physical Album (4th Quarter)	Born Pink	Nominated	
Circle Chart Music Awards	2024	Social Hot Star of the Year	Blackpink	Won	
Clio Awards	2020	Music Marketing – Partnerships & Collaborations	"Ice Cream" (with Selena Gomez)	Silver	
Clio Awards	2026	Music Marketing – Visual Effects	"Jump"	Bronze	
D Awards	2025	Best Girl Group Popularity Award	Blackpink	Nominated	
D Awards	2026	Best Girl Group Popularity Award	Blackpink	Nominated	
Elle Style Awards (Note: The Elle Style Awards were inaugurated in 2017 by Elle Korea in commemoration of the magazine's 25th anniversary. The awards celebrate the most influential domestic figures in the fields of fashion, culture, and art. Nominees are recommended by individuals who have also contributed to the defining styles of South Korea within these circles. Final winners are chosen by expert industry judges.)	2018	K-Style Icon	Blackpink	Won	
The Fact Music Awards	2020	TMA Popularity Award	Blackpink	Nominated	
The Fact Music Awards	2021	Fan N Star Choice Artist	Blackpink	Nominated	
The Fact Music Awards	2022	Global Fan N Star	Blackpink	Nominated	
Genie Music Awards	2018	Artist of the Year	Blackpink	Nominated	
Genie Music Awards	2018	Best Female Dance Performance	"Ddu-Du Ddu-Du"	Nominated	
Genie Music Awards	2018	Best Female Group	Blackpink	Nominated	
Genie Music Awards	2018	Popularity Award	Blackpink	Nominated	
Genie Music Awards	2018	Song of the Year	"Ddu-Du Ddu-Du"	Nominated	
Genie Music Awards	2019	Artist of the Year	Blackpink	Nominated	
Genie Music Awards	2019	Best Female Group	Blackpink	Nominated	
Genie Music Awards	2019	Best Female Performing Artist	Blackpink	Nominated	
Genie Music Awards	2019	Global Popularity Award	Blackpink	Nominated	
Genie Music Awards	2019	Popularity Award	Blackpink	Nominated	
Genie Music Awards	2020	Artist of the Year	Blackpink	Nominated	
Genie Music Awards	2022	Album of the Year	Born Pink	Nominated	
Genie Music Awards	2022	Best Female Group	Blackpink	Nominated	
Genie Music Awards	2022	Best Female Performance	Blackpink	Nominated	
Genie Music Awards	2022	Global Popularity Award	Blackpink	Nominated	
Golden Disc Awards	2017	Rookie Artist of the Year	Blackpink	Won	
Golden Disc Awards	2017	Best Digital Song (Bonsang)	"Whistle"	Nominated	
Golden Disc Awards	2017	Most Popular Artist	Blackpink	Nominated	
Golden Disc Awards	2018	Best Digital Song (Bonsang)	"As If It's Your Last"	Won	
Golden Disc Awards	2018	Song of the Year (Daesang)	"As If It's Your Last"	Nominated	
Golden Disc Awards	2018	Most Popular Artist	Blackpink	Nominated	
Golden Disc Awards	2019	Cosmopolitan Artist Award	Blackpink	Won	
Golden Disc Awards	2019	Best Digital Song (Bonsang)	"Ddu-Du Ddu-Du"	Won	
Golden Disc Awards	2019	Song of the Year (Daesang)	"Ddu-Du Ddu-Du"	Nominated	
Golden Disc Awards	2019	Most Popular Artist	Blackpink	Nominated	
Golden Disc Awards	2020	Best Digital Song (Bonsang)	"Kill This Love"	Nominated	
Golden Disc Awards	2020	Most Popular Artist	Blackpink	Nominated	
Golden Disc Awards	2020	NetEase Fans' Choice K-pop Star Award	Blackpink	Nominated	
Golden Disc Awards	2021	Best Album (Bonsang)	The Album	Won	
Golden Disc Awards	2021	Best Digital Song (Bonsang)	"How You Like That"	Won	
Golden Disc Awards	2021	Album of the Year (Daesang)	The Album	Nominated	
Golden Disc Awards	2021	Song of the Year (Daesang)	"How You Like That"	Nominated	
Golden Disc Awards	2021	Most Popular Artist	Blackpink	Nominated	
Golden Disc Awards	2021	QQ Music Fan's Choice K-Pop Artist	Blackpink	Nominated	
Golden Disc Awards	2023	Best Album (Bonsang)	Born Pink	Won	
Golden Disc Awards	2023	Album of the Year (Daesang)	Born Pink	Nominated	
Golden Disc Awards	2023	Best Digital Song (Bonsang)	"Pink Venom"	Nominated	
Golden Disc Awards	2023	Most Popular Artist	Blackpink	Nominated	
Golden Disc Awards	2026	Best Digital Song (Bonsang)	"Jump"	Won	
Golden Disc Awards	2026	Song of the Year (Daesang)	"Jump"	Nominated	
Golden Disc Awards	2026	Most Popular Artist (Female)	Blackpink	Nominated	
Hallyu K Fans' Choice Awards	2016	Best Girl Group	Blackpink	Won	
Hallyu K Fans' Choice Awards	2016	Best Rookie Group	Blackpink	Won	
Hanteo Music Awards	2021	WhosFandom Award	Blackpink	Nominated	
Hanteo Music Awards	2023	Artist of the Year (Bonsang)	Blackpink	Won	
Hanteo Music Awards	2023	Global Artist – South America	Blackpink	Won	
Hanteo Music Awards	2023	WhosFandom Award	Blackpink	Nominated	
Hanteo Music Awards	2024	WhosFandom Award	Blackpink	Nominated	
Hanteo Music Awards	2025	WhosFandom Award	Blackpink	Nominated	
Hanteo Music Awards	2026	WhosFandom Award	Blackpink	Nominated	
iHeartRadio Music Awards	2020	Favourite Music Video Choreography	"Kill This Love"	Won	
iHeartRadio Music Awards	2020	Best Music Video	"Kill This Love"	Nominated	
iHeartRadio Music Awards	2021	Best Fan Army	Blackpink	Nominated	
iHeartRadio Music Awards	2021	Best Music Video	"How You Like That"	Nominated	
iHeartRadio Music Awards	2023	Best Duo/Group of the Year	Blackpink	Nominated	
iHeartRadio Music Awards	2023	Best Fan Army	Blackpink	Nominated	
iHeartRadio Music Awards	2023	Best Music Video	"Pink Venom"	Nominated	
iHeartRadio Music Awards	2023	Favorite Use of a Sample	"Pink Venom"	Nominated	
iHeartRadio Music Awards	2026	Best Music Video	"Jump"	Nominated	
iHeartRadio Music Awards	2026	Favorite TikTok Dance	"Jump"	Nominated	
iHeartRadio Music Awards	2026	Favorite Tour Style	Deadline World Tour	Nominated	
iHeartRadio Music Awards	2026	K-pop Group of the Year	Blackpink	Nominated	
iHeartRadio Music Awards	2026	K-pop Song of the Year	"Jump"	Nominated	
Japan Gold Disc Awards	2018	Best 3 New Artists (Asia)	Blackpink	Won	
Joox Hong Kong Top Music Awards	2020	Fan Favorite K-Pop	"How You Like That"	Won	
Joox Indonesia Music Awards	2021	Best Fanbase of the Year	Blackpink	Nominated	
Joox Indonesia Music Awards	2021	Global Song of the Year	"Ice Cream" (with Selena Gomez)	Nominated	
Joox Indonesia Music Awards	2021	Korean Artist of the Year	Blackpink	Nominated	
Joox Thailand Music Awards	2018	K-Pop Artist of the Year	Blackpink	Nominated	
Joox Thailand Music Awards	2019	K-Pop Artist of the Year	Blackpink	Nominated	
Joox Thailand Music Awards	2020	K-Pop Artist of the Year	Blackpink	Won	
Joox Thailand Music Awards	2021	Top Social Artist of the Year	Blackpink	Nominated	
Joox Thailand Music Awards	2022	Top Social Global Artist of the Year	Blackpink	Nominated	
K-World Dream Awards	2017	Bonsang Award	Blackpink	Nominated	
K-World Dream Awards	2017	Popularity Award	Blackpink	Nominated	
K-World Dream Awards	2018	Bonsang Award	Blackpink	Nominated	
K-World Dream Awards	2018	Global Fandom Award	Blackpink	Nominated	
K-World Dream Awards	2018	Popularity Award (Female)	Blackpink	Nominated	
K-World Dream Awards	2019	Bonsang Award	Blackpink	Nominated	
K-World Dream Awards	2019	Popularity Award (Female)	Blackpink	Nominated	
K-World Dream Awards	2020	Popularity Award (Female)	Blackpink	Nominated	
K-World Dream Awards	2022	Girl Group Popularity Award	Blackpink	Nominated	
K-World Dream Awards	2023	Girl Group Popularity Award	Blackpink	Nominated	
K-World Dream Awards	2024	Girl Group Popularity Award	Blackpink	Nominated	
K-World Dream Awards	2025	Girl Group Popularity Award	Blackpink	Nominated	
K-World Dream Awards	2026	Best Album Award	Blackpink	Won	
KM Chart Awards (Note: Hosted by KM Chart and KM Chart World and organized by the KMA Organizing Committee and Upick, the KM Chart Awards is an awards ceremony to honor K-pop artists for their contributions to the global music scene over the previous year.)	2026	Best Popular Female Group Award	Blackpink	Nominated	
KM Chart Awards	2026	Best Popular Song Award	"Jump"	Nominated	
KM Chart Awards	2026	Best Popular Song Award	"Go"	Nominated	
Korea First Brand Awards (Note: Hosted by the Korea Consumer Brand Committee and the Korea Consumer Forum, the Korea First Brand Awards bases its winners on a nationwide South Korean survey.)	2021	Best Female Idol	Blackpink	Won	
Korea Grand Music Awards	2024	Trend of the Year – K-pop Group	Blackpink	Nominated	
Korea Grand Music Awards	2025	Best Artist 10	Blackpink	Nominated	
Korea Grand Music Awards	2025	Best Dance Performance	"Jump"	Nominated	
Korea Grand Music Awards	2025	Best Music Video	"Jump"	Nominated	
Korea Grand Music Awards	2025	Trend of the Year – K-pop Group	Blackpink	Nominated	
Korea Grand Music Awards	2026	Best Artist	Blackpink	Won	
Korea Popular Music Awards (Note: Created in 2018 by the Korea Singers Association, the Korea Entertainment Producer's Association, the Recording Industry Association of Korea, the Federation of Korean Music Performers, and the Korea Music Copyright Association, the Korea Popular Music Awards is designed to honor leaders in the hallyu wave.)	2018	Artist of the Year	Blackpink	Nominated	
Korea Popular Music Awards	2018	Best Group Dance	"Ddu-Du Ddu-Du"	Nominated	
Korea Popular Music Awards	2018	Popularity Award	Blackpink	Nominated	
Korea Popular Music Awards	2018	Song of the Year	"Ddu-Du Ddu-Du"	Nominated	
MAMA Awards	2016	Best Music Video	"Whistle"	Won	
MAMA Awards	2016	Best of Next Female Artist	Blackpink	Won	
MAMA Awards	2016	Best New Artist – Female Group	Blackpink	Nominated	
MAMA Awards	2016	iQiYi Worldwide Favorite Artist	Blackpink	Nominated	
MAMA Awards	2017	Best Female Group	Blackpink	Nominated	
MAMA Awards	2017	Qoo10 2017 Favorite K-pop Star	Blackpink	Nominated	
MAMA Awards	2018	Worldwide Fans' Choice Top 10	Blackpink	Won	
MAMA Awards	2018	Artist of the Year	Blackpink	Nominated	
MAMA Awards	2018	Best Dance Performance Female Group	"Ddu-Du Ddu-Du"	Nominated	
MAMA Awards	2018	Best Female Group	Blackpink	Nominated	
MAMA Awards	2018	Best Music Video	"Ddu-Du Ddu-Du"	Nominated	
MAMA Awards	2018	Song of the Year	"Ddu-Du Ddu-Du"	Nominated	
MAMA Awards	2018	Worldwide Icon of the Year	Blackpink	Nominated	
MAMA Awards	2019	Worldwide Fans' Choice Top 10	Blackpink	Won	
MAMA Awards	2019	Album of the Year	Kill This Love	Nominated	
MAMA Awards	2019	Artist of the Year	Blackpink	Nominated	
MAMA Awards	2019	Best Dance Performance Female Group	"Kill This Love"	Nominated	
MAMA Awards	2019	Best Female Group	Blackpink	Nominated	
MAMA Awards	2019	Qoo10 Favorite Female Artist	Blackpink	Nominated	
MAMA Awards	2019	Song of the Year	"Kill This Love"	Nominated	
MAMA Awards	2019	Worldwide Icon of the Year	Blackpink	Nominated	
MAMA Awards	2020	2020 Visionary	Blackpink	Won	
MAMA Awards	2020	Best Dance Performance Female Group	"How You Like That"	Won	
MAMA Awards	2020	Best Female Group	Blackpink	Won	
MAMA Awards	2020	Worldwide Fans' Choice Top 10	Blackpink	Won	
MAMA Awards	2020	Album of the Year	The Album	Nominated	
MAMA Awards	2020	Artist of the Year	Blackpink	Nominated	
MAMA Awards	2020	Song of the Year	"How You Like That"	Nominated	
MAMA Awards	2020	Worldwide Icon of the Year	Blackpink	Nominated	
MAMA Awards	2022	Best Female Group	Blackpink	Won	
MAMA Awards	2022	Best Music Video	"Pink Venom"	Won	
MAMA Awards	2022	Worldwide Fans' Choice Top 10	Blackpink	Won	
MAMA Awards	2022	Album of the Year	Born Pink	Nominated	
MAMA Awards	2022	Artist of the Year	Blackpink	Nominated	
MAMA Awards	2022	Best Dance Performance Female Group	"Pink Venom"	Nominated	
MAMA Awards	2022	Song of the Year	"Pink Venom"	Nominated	
MAMA Awards	2022	Worldwide Icon of the Year	Blackpink	Nominated	
MAMA Awards	2025	Best Dance Performance Female Group	"Jump"	Nominated	
MAMA Awards	2025	Best Music Video	"Jump"	Nominated	
MAMA Awards	2025	Fans' Choice Female Top 10	Blackpink	Nominated	
MAMA Awards	2025	Fans' Choice of the Year	Blackpink	Nominated	
MAMA Awards	2025	Song of the Year	"Jump"	Nominated	
MAMA Awards	2026	Album of the Year	Deadline	Nominated	
MAMA Awards	2026	Artist of the Year	Blackpink	Nominated	
MAMA Awards	2026	Best Female Group	Blackpink	Nominated	
MAMA Awards	2026	Fans' Choice Female Top 10	Blackpink	Nominated	
MAMA Awards	2026	Fans' Choice of the Year	Blackpink	Nominated	
Melon Music Awards	2016	Best New Artist	Blackpink	Won	
Melon Music Awards	2016	Top 10 Artist	Blackpink	Nominated	
Melon Music Awards	2017	Best Dance – Female	"As If It's Your Last"	Nominated	
Melon Music Awards	2017	Kakao Hot Star Award	Blackpink	Nominated	
Melon Music Awards	2017	Song of the Year	"As If It's Your Last"	Nominated	
Melon Music Awards	2017	Top 10 Artist	Blackpink	Nominated	
Melon Music Awards	2018	Best Dance – Female	"Ddu-Du Ddu-Du"	Won	
Melon Music Awards	2018	Top 10 Artist	Blackpink	Won	
Melon Music Awards	2018	Album of the Year	Square Up	Nominated	
Melon Music Awards	2018	Artist of the Year	Blackpink	Nominated	
Melon Music Awards	2018	Kakao Hot Star Award	Blackpink	Nominated	
Melon Music Awards	2018	Song of the Year	"Ddu-Du Ddu-Du"	Nominated	
Melon Music Awards	2019	Best Rap/Hip Hop Track	"Kill This Love"	Nominated	
Melon Music Awards	2019	Top 10 Artist	Blackpink	Nominated	
Melon Music Awards	2020	Best Dance – Female	"How You Like That"	Won	
Melon Music Awards	2020	Top 10 Artist	Blackpink	Won	
Melon Music Awards	2020	Album of the Year	The Album	Nominated	
Melon Music Awards	2020	Artist of the Year	Blackpink	Nominated	
Melon Music Awards	2020	Netizen Popularity Award	Blackpink	Nominated	
Melon Music Awards	2020	Song of the Year	"How You Like That"	Nominated	
Melon Music Awards	2022	Album of the Year	Born Pink	Nominated	
Melon Music Awards	2022	Artist of the Year	Blackpink	Nominated	
Melon Music Awards	2022	Best Female Group	Blackpink	Nominated	
Melon Music Awards	2022	Netizen Popularity Award	Blackpink	Nominated	
Melon Music Awards	2022	Top 10 Artist	Blackpink	Nominated	
Melon Music Awards	2025	Top 10 Artist	Blackpink	Nominated	
Melon Music Awards	2026	Global Top 10	Blackpink	Nominated	
Melon Music Awards	2026	Top 10 Artist	Blackpink	Nominated	
Meus Prêmios Nick	2018	Fandom of the Year	Blackpink	Nominated	
Meus Prêmios Nick	2018	Favorite International Artist	Blackpink	Nominated	
Meus Prêmios Nick	2019	Fandom of the Year	Blackpink	Nominated	
Meus Prêmios Nick	2019	Favorite International Artist	Blackpink	Nominated	
Meus Prêmios Nick	2020	Fandom of the Year	Blackpink	Nominated	
Meus Prêmios Nick	2020	Favorite International Hit	"How You Like That"	Nominated	
Meus Prêmios Nick	2021	Fandom of the Year	Blackpink	Nominated	
Meus Prêmios Nick	2021	Favorite Music Group	Blackpink	Nominated	
MTV Europe Music Awards	2019	Best Group	Blackpink	Nominated	
MTV Europe Music Awards	2020	Best Collaboration	"Ice Cream" (with Selena Gomez)	Nominated	
MTV Europe Music Awards	2020	Best Group	Blackpink	Nominated	
MTV Europe Music Awards	2020	Biggest Fans	Blackpink	Nominated	
MTV Europe Music Awards	2021	Biggest Fans	Blackpink	Nominated	
MTV Europe Music Awards	2022	Best Metaverse Performance	Blackpink: The Virtual	Won	
MTV Europe Music Awards	2022	Best K-Pop	Blackpink	Nominated	
MTV Europe Music Awards	2022	Best Video	"Pink Venom"	Nominated	
MTV Europe Music Awards	2022	Biggest Fans	Blackpink	Nominated	
MTV Europe Music Awards	2023	Biggest Fans	Blackpink	Nominated	
MTV MIAW Awards	2019	K-Pop Explosion	Blackpink	Nominated	
MTV MIAW Awards	2021	Best Fandom	Blackpink	Nominated	
MTV MIAW Awards	2021	K-Pop Domination	Blackpink	Nominated	
MTV MIAW Awards	2023	K-Pop Domination	Blackpink	Won	
MTV MIAW Awards Brazil	2019	Biggest Fans	Blackpink	Nominated	
MTV MIAW Awards Brazil	2019	K-Pop Explosion	Blackpink	Nominated	
MTV MIAW Awards Brazil	2020	Best International Feature	"Sour Candy" (with Lady Gaga)	Won	
MTV MIAW Awards Brazil	2020	Biggest Fans	Blackpink	Nominated	
MTV MIAW Awards Brazil	2021	Global Hit	"Lovesick Girls"	Won	
MTV MIAW Awards Brazil	2021	Biggest Fans	Blackpink	Nominated	
MTV Video Music Awards	2019	Best Group	Blackpink	Nominated	
MTV Video Music Awards	2019	Best K-Pop	"Kill This Love"	Nominated	
MTV Video Music Awards	2020	Song of Summer	"How You Like That"	Won	
MTV Video Music Awards	2020	Best Group	Blackpink	Nominated	
MTV Video Music Awards	2021	Best K-Pop	"Ice Cream" (with Selena Gomez)	Nominated	
MTV Video Music Awards	2021	Group of the Year	Blackpink	Nominated	
MTV Video Music Awards	2022	Best Metaverse Performance	Blackpink: The Virtual	Won	
MTV Video Music Awards	2022	Group of the Year	Blackpink	Nominated	
MTV Video Music Awards	2023	Best Choreography	"Pink Venom"	Won	
MTV Video Music Awards	2023	Group of the Year	Blackpink	Won	
MTV Video Music Awards	2023	Best Art Direction	"Pink Venom"	Nominated	
MTV Video Music Awards	2023	Best Editing	"Pink Venom"	Nominated	
MTV Video Music Awards	2023	Best K-Pop	"Pink Venom"	Nominated	
MTV Video Music Awards	2023	Show of the Summer	Blackpink	Nominated	
MTV Video Music Awards	2025	Best Group	Blackpink	Won	
MTV Video Music Awards	2026	Best Group	Blackpink	Nominated	
MTV Video Music Awards	2026	Best K-Pop	"Jump"	Nominated	
MTV Video Music Awards Japan	2018	Best Dance Video	"Ddu-Du Ddu-Du"	Won	
MTV Video Music Awards Japan	2022	Best Group Video (International)	"Pink Venom"	Won	
MTV Video Music Awards Japan	2022	Video of the Year	"Pink Venom"	Nominated	
Music Awards Japan	2026	Best K-Pop Song in Japan	"Jump"	Won	
Music Awards Japan	2026	Best K-Pop Artist	Blackpink	Nominated	
Music Awards Japan	2026	Best of Listeners' Choice: International Song	"Jump"	Nominated	
Nickelodeon Kids' Choice Awards	2019	Favorite Global Music Star	Blackpink	Nominated	
Nickelodeon Kids' Choice Awards	2021	Favorite Music Collaboration	"Ice Cream" (with Selena Gomez)	Nominated	
Nickelodeon Kids' Choice Awards	2021	Favorite Music Group	Blackpink	Nominated	
Nickelodeon Kids' Choice Awards	2023	Favorite Global Music Star	Blackpink	Nominated	
Nickelodeon Kids' Choice Awards	2023	Favorite Music Group	Blackpink	Nominated	
Nickelodeon Kids' Choice Awards	2024	Favorite Global Music Star	Blackpink	Nominated	
Nickelodeon Kids' Choice Awards	2024	Favorite Ticket of the Year	Born Pink World Tour	Nominated	
Nickelodeon Kids' Choice Awards	2026	Favorite Music Group or Duo	Blackpink	Nominated	
Nickelodeon Mexico Kids' Choice Awards	2019	Favorite International Artist or Group	Blackpink	Nominated	
Nickelodeon Mexico Kids' Choice Awards	2019	Best Fandom	Blackpink	Nominated	
Nickelodeon Mexico Kids' Choice Awards	2021	K-Pop Bomb	Blackpink	Nominated	
Nickelodeon Mexico Kids' Choice Awards	2022	Favorite K-Pop Group	Blackpink	Nominated	
Nickelodeon Mexico Kids' Choice Awards	2022	Master Fandom	Blackpink	Nominated	
Nickelodeon Mexico Kids' Choice Awards	2023	Favorite K-Pop Group	Blackpink	Nominated	
NRJ Music Awards	2022	International Clip of the Year	"Pink Venom"	Nominated	
NRJ Music Awards	2022	International Group / Duo of the Year	Blackpink	Nominated	
People's Choice Awards	2019	The Concert Tour of 2019	In Your Area World Tour	Won	
People's Choice Awards	2019	The Group of 2019	Blackpink	Won	
People's Choice Awards	2019	The Music Video of 2019	"Kill This Love"	Won	
People's Choice Awards	2020	The Group of 2020	Blackpink	Nominated	
People's Choice Awards	2020	The Music Video of 2020	"Ice Cream" (with Selena Gomez)	Nominated	
People's Choice Awards	2022	The Group of 2022	Blackpink	Nominated	
People's Choice Awards	2022	The Music Video of 2022	"Pink Venom"	Nominated	
Philippine K-pop Awards	2017	Best Female Group	Blackpink	Won	
QQ Music Boom Boom Awards	2020	Most Popular Overseas Group	Blackpink	Won	
RTHK International Pop Poll Awards	2021	Top Band/Group	Blackpink	Gold	
RTHK International Pop Poll Awards	2021	Top Ten International Gold Songs	"Lovesick Girls"	Won	
RTHK International Pop Poll Awards	2022	Top Album Award – Korean	Born Pink	Won	
SEC Awards (Note: The SEC Awards, formerly known as the Séries em Cena Awards, is a Brazilian award show that honors achievements in music, film, television, and internet culture in Brazil and globally.)	2023	International Group/Duo of the Year	Blackpink	Won	
SEC Awards	2026	International Group/Duo of the Year	Blackpink	Nominated	
SEC Awards	2026	International Album/EP of the Year	Deadline	Nominated	
SEC Awards	2026	International Song of the Year	"Jump"	Nominated	
Seoul Music Awards	2017	New Artist of the Year	Blackpink	Won	
Seoul Music Awards	2017	Main Prize (Bonsang)	Blackpink	Nominated	
Seoul Music Awards	2017	Korean Wave Award	Blackpink	Nominated	
Seoul Music Awards	2017	Popularity Award	Blackpink	Nominated	
Seoul Music Awards	2018	Main Prize (Bonsang)	Blackpink	Won	
Seoul Music Awards	2018	Grand Prize (Daesang)	Blackpink	Nominated	
Seoul Music Awards	2018	Korean Wave Award	Blackpink	Nominated	
Seoul Music Awards	2018	Popularity Award	Blackpink	Nominated	
Seoul Music Awards	2019	Main Prize (Bonsang)	Blackpink	Nominated	
Seoul Music Awards	2019	Korean Wave Award	Blackpink	Nominated	
Seoul Music Awards	2019	Popularity Award	Blackpink	Nominated	
Seoul Music Awards	2020	Main Prize (Bonsang)	Kill This Love	Nominated	
Seoul Music Awards	2020	Korean Wave Award	Blackpink	Nominated	
Seoul Music Awards	2020	Popularity Award	Blackpink	Nominated	
Seoul Music Awards	2020	QQ Music Most Popular K-Pop Artist Award	Blackpink	Nominated	
Seoul Music Awards	2021	Main Prize (Bonsang)	How You Like That	Nominated	
Seoul Music Awards	2021	Fan PD Artist Award	Blackpink	Nominated	
Seoul Music Awards	2021	Korean Wave Award	Blackpink	Nominated	
Seoul Music Awards	2021	Popularity Award	Blackpink	Nominated	
Seoul Music Awards	2021	WhosFandom Award	Blackpink	Nominated	
Seoul Music Awards	2023	Main Prize (Bonsang)	Born Pink	Won	
Seoul Music Awards	2023	Grand Prize (Daesang)	Blackpink	Nominated	
Seoul Music Awards	2023	Idolplus Best Star Award	Blackpink	Nominated	
Seoul Music Awards	2023	Korean Wave Award	Blackpink	Nominated	
Seoul Music Awards	2023	Popularity Award	Blackpink	Nominated	
Seoul Music Awards	2024	World Best Artist	Blackpink	Won	
Seoul Music Awards	2026	K-pop World Choice – Group	Blackpink	Nominated	
Seoul Music Awards	2026	Popularity Award	Blackpink	Nominated	
Seoul Music Awards	2026	R&B Hiphop Award	Blackpink	Nominated	
Seoul Success Awards	2022	Popular Culture Grand Prize – Singer	Blackpink	Won	
Shorty Awards	2019	Best in Music	Blackpink	Won	
Soompi Awards	2017	Rookie of the Year	Blackpink	Won	
Soompi Awards	2018	Best Female Group	Blackpink	Nominated	
Soompi Awards	2019	Best Female Group	Blackpink	Won	
Spotify Awards (Note: The Spotify Awards were announced in November 2019 with its inaugural show held in March 2020 in Mexico City, the platform's biggest single market. Nominees and winners across more than 50 categories, including Artist of The Year and Emerging Artist, are based on sales, streaming and user-engagement data.)	2020	Most Listened K-pop Artist (Female)	Blackpink	Won	
Teen Choice Awards	2018	Choice Fandom	Blackpink	Nominated	
Teen Choice Awards	2018	Choice International Artist	Blackpink	Nominated	
Teen Choice Awards	2018	Choice Next Big Thing	Blackpink	Nominated	
Teen Choice Awards	2019	Choice Song: Group	"Ddu-Du Ddu-Du"	Won	
Teen Choice Awards	2019	Choice Fandom	Blackpink	Nominated	
Teen Choice Awards	2019	Choice International Artist	Blackpink	Nominated	
Teen Choice Awards	2019	Choice Summer Tour	In Your Area World Tour	Nominated	
Telehit Awards	2019	Best K-pop of the Year	Blackpink	Nominated	
Tencent Music Entertainment Awards	2019	Best Japanese and Korean Artist of the Year	Blackpink	Won	
Tencent Music Entertainment Awards	2020	Best Overseas Group	Blackpink	Won	
TMElive International Music Awards	2026	The Best Song of the Year	"Jump"	Won	
Tokopedia WIB Indonesia K-Pop Awards	2021	The Most Pretty Savage	Blackpink	Won	
Variety Hitmakers Awards	2020	Group of the Year	Blackpink	Won	
V Live Awards	2017	Global Rookie Top 5	Blackpink	Won	
V Live Awards	2018	Global Artist Top 10	Blackpink	Won	
V Live Awards	2019	Global Artist Top 10	Blackpink	Won	
V Live Awards	2019	Global Artist Top 12	Blackpink	Won	
V Live Awards	2019	Best Channel – 3 Million Followers	Blackpink	Nominated	
V Live Awards	2019	The Most Loved Artist	Blackpink	Nominated	
Webby Awards	2023	Best Partnership or Collaboration, Features (Social)	#PinkVenomChallenge	Won	
Weibo Starlight Awards	2021	Favorite Collaboration	"Ice Cream" (with Selena Gomez)	Won	
YouTube Creator Awards	2018	Diamond Creator Award	Blackpink	Won	
YouTube Creator Awards	2026	Red Diamond Creator Award	Blackpink	Won	

== Other accolades ==
=== State and cultural honors ===
Name of country, year given, and name of honor
Country	Year	Honor	Ref.
South Korea (Note: Awarded at the Korean Popular Culture and Arts Awards, organised by the Korea Creative Content Agency and hosted by the South Korean Ministry of Culture, Sports and Tourism. Honors are given to individuals or groups for their contribution to popular culture in South Korea and abroad.)	2026	Okgwan Order of Cultural Merit (4th Class)	
United Kingdom	2023	Most Excellent Order of the British Empire (MBE)	

=== Listicles ===
Name of publisher, year listed, name of listicle, and placement
Publisher	Year	Listicle	Placement	Ref.
Billboard	2025	Greatest Pop Stars of 2025: Honorable Mentions	Placed	
Business of Fashion (Note: The BoF 500 is an annual fashion industry power list of global figures who have made an impact in the $2.4 trillion fashion industry.)	2022	BoF 500	Placed	
Forbes Asia	2019	30 Under 30	Placed	
Forbes Asia	2020	100 Digital Stars	Placed	
Forbes Korea	2019	Power Celebrity 40	1st	
Forbes Korea	2020	Power Celebrity 40	3rd	
Forbes Korea	2021	Power Celebrity 40	2nd	
Forbes Korea	2022	Power Celebrity 40	2nd	
Forbes Korea	2023	Power Celebrity 40	3rd	
Forbes Korea	2024	Power Celebrity 40	1st	
Forbes Korea	2025	K-Idol of the Year 30	6th	
Forbes Korea	2026	Power Celebrity 40	3rd	
Fortune	2025	Most Influential Women Asia	Placed	
Gold House (Note: The A100 List honors the most impactful Asians and Asian American & Pacific Islanders (AAPIs) in culture every May for AAPI Heritage Month. Gold House "champions trailblazing members of the AAPI community and their transformative contributions to entertainment, fashion, lifestyle, technology, business, social activism and politics from the past year.")	2020	A100 Most Impactful Asians List	Placed	
Gold House	2021	A100 Most Impactful Asians List	Placed	
Gold House	2022	A100 Hall of Fame	Inducted	
Golden Disc Awards	2025	Golden Disc Powerhouse 40	Placed	
Guinness World Records	2026	Guinness World Records Icon	Inducted	
IZM	2025	The 25 Greatest Musicians of the first 25 Years of the 21st Century	Placed	
Korea Federation of Copyright Societies (Note: The Korea Federation of Copyright Societies is an association that consists of 10 organizations, including the Korea Music Copyright Association (KOMCA), the Korean Music Performers Association, the Korean Broadcasting Writers Association, and the Korea Press Foundation, and has a total of 300,000 members.)	2023	Korea World Music Culture Hall of Fame	Inducted	
People	2026	13 Girl Groups That Changed the Music Industry Forever	Placed	
Rolling Stone	2023	The 25 Most Stylish Musicians of 2023	6th	
Sisa Journal (Note: The Sisa Journal is one of the major weekly news magazines in Korea. Established in 1989, its annually conducted 'Who Moves Korea' survey determines the most influential figures in the country and highlights next-generation leaders of Korea. The survey is conducted on a total of 1000 experts across 10 fields, including professors, journalists, politicians, businessmen, and cultural artists.)	2020	100 Next Generation Leaders – Culture and Arts	3rd	
Teen Vogue	2024	21 Best Girl Groups of All Time	Placed	
Time	2019	Time 100 Next	Placed	
Time	2022	Entertainer of the Year	Placed	
Us Weekly	2022	Best Girl Groups of All Time	Placed	
Variety	2020	Power of Young Hollywood	Placed	
Variety	2021	Women That Have Made an Impact in Global Entertainment	Placed	

=== World records ===
Key
†	Indicates a formerly held world record (Note: Note that this does not indicate that Blackpink lost the record, only that the listed record holder (i.e. a music video) was eventually surpassed.)

Name of record body, year the record was awarded, name of the record, and the name of the record holder
Publication	Year	World record	Record holder	Ref.
Guinness World Records	2020	† Most viewed YouTube video in 24 hours (Note: With 86.3 million views on the first day of release, "How You Like That" broke the record held by BTS's "Boy with Luv" (2019) for the most viewed YouTube video in 24 hours on June 26, 2020.)	"How You Like That"	
Guinness World Records	2020	† Most viewed YouTube music video in 24 hours	"How You Like That"	
Guinness World Records	2020	† Most viewed YouTube music video in 24 hours by a K-pop group	"How You Like That"	
Guinness World Records	2020	† Most viewers for the premiere of a video on YouTube (Note: With 1.66 million peak concurrent viewers for the live premiere, "How You Like That" set a new record for the most viewers for the premiere of a video on YouTube on June 26, 2020.)	"How You Like That"	
Guinness World Records	2020	† Most viewers for the premiere of a music video on YouTube	"How You Like That"	
Guinness World Records	2021	† Most subscribers for a band on YouTube (Note: Blackpink achieved the record with 60.3 million subscribers as of April 22, 2021. They extended the record to 93.8 million subscribers as of May 31, 2024, when they were also recognized as the most subscribed music act overall on YouTube. They further extended the record for the most subscribed band and music act overall to 99.3 million subscribers as of November 26, 2025, and 100 million subscribers as of April 1, 2026.)	Blackpink	
Guinness World Records	2022	First winner of Best Metaverse Performance at the MTV Video Music Awards	Blackpink: The Virtual	
Guinness World Records	2022	First K-pop group to reach No.1 on the UK albums chart (female)	Born Pink	
Guinness World Records	2022	First K-pop group to reach No.1 on the US albums chart (female)	Born Pink	
Guinness World Records	2023	† Most streamed female group on Spotify (Note: Blackpink, surpassing Little Mix, achieved the record with 8.88 billion streams as of March 3, 2023. They extended the record to 13.09 billion streams as of May 31, 2024, 16.12 billion streams as of November 26, 2025, and 16.94 billion streams as of April 1, 2026.)	Blackpink	
Guinness World Records	2023	† Most viewed music channel on YouTube (group) (Note: Blackpink, surpassing Maroon 5, achieved the record with 30.15 billion views as of April 12, 2023. They extended the record to 40.77 billion views as of November 26, 2025, and 41.75 billion views as of April 1, 2026.)	Blackpink	
Guinness World Records	2024	† Most subscribers for a band on YouTube	Blackpink	
Guinness World Records	2024	† Most streamed female group on Spotify	Blackpink	
Guinness World Records	2025	† Most subscribers for a band on YouTube	Blackpink	
Guinness World Records	2025	† Most streamed female group on Spotify	Blackpink	
Guinness World Records	2025	† Most views for a band on YouTube	Blackpink	
Guinness World Records	2026	Most subscribers for a band on YouTube	Blackpink	
Guinness World Records	2026	Most streamed female group on Spotify	Blackpink	
Guinness World Records	2026	Most views for a band on YouTube	Blackpink	

According to Guinness World Records, with 56.7 million views on the first day of release, Blackpink's "Kill This Love" (2019) broke the three records for the most viewed YouTube video in 24 hours, the most viewed YouTube music video in 24 hours, and the most viewed YouTube music video in 24 hours by a K-pop group. They had a fleeting grasp of the three record titles for just over a week before being surpassed by BTS's "Boy with Luv" (2019). As such, while the awarding body acknowledged the brief retaining period, the video was never certified as an official world record holder.

=== Streaming milestones ===
Name of the achievement, year presented, category, and work(s)
Achievement	Year	Category	Work(s)	Ref.
Spotify Billions Club	2024	Billions Club Plaque	"How You Like That"	
Spotify Billions Club	2026	Billions Club Plaque	"Kill This Love"	
Spotify Billions Club	2026	Billions Club Plaque	"Pink Venom"	

== See also ==
- List of awards and nominations received by Jisoo
- List of awards and nominations received by Jennie
- List of awards and nominations received by Rosé
- List of awards and nominations received by Lisa
