= People's Choice Award for Favorite Group =

American music popularity award

People's Choice Awards for Favorite Group
- Country: United States
- First award: 2012
- Final award: 2022
- Currently held by: Stray Kids

Highlights
- Most awards: BTS (4)
- Most nominations: Maroon 5 and Imagine Dragons (6 each)

The People's Choice Awards for Favorite Group is one of the awards handed out at the People's Choice Awards. It was first awarded to Maroon 5 in 2012. The band is the most-nominated artist in the category together with Imagine Dragons. Both acts have earned a total of six nominations each. BTS is the most-awarded group in the category, having won four times.

== Recipients ==
Year	Recipient	Nominees	Ref.
2012	Maroon 5	Coldplay; Foo Fighters; Linkin Park; Red Hot Chili Peppers	
2013	Maroon 5	Green Day; Linkin Park; No Doubt; Train	
2014	One Direction	Imagine Dragons; Maroon 5; OneRepublic; Paramore	
2015	Maroon 5	Coldplay; Imagine Dragons; One Direction; OneRepublic	
2016	Fifth Harmony	Fall Out Boy; Imagine Dragons; Maroon 5; One Direction	
2017	Fifth Harmony	The Chainsmokers; Coldplay; Panic! at the Disco; Twenty One Pilots	
2018	BTS	5 Seconds of Summer; Super Junior; Panic! at the Disco; Twenty One Pilots	
2019	Blackpink	5 Seconds of Summer; BTS; The Chainsmokers; CNCO; Imagine Dragons; Jonas Brothers; Panic! at the Disco	
2020	BTS	Blackpink; Chloe x Halle; CNCO; Dan + Shay; 5 Seconds of Summer; Jonas Brothers; Twenty One Pilots	
2021	BTS	Coldplay; Dan + Shay; Imagine Dragons; Jonas Brothers; Maroon 5; Migos; Twenty One Pilots	
2022	BTS	5 Seconds of Summer; Blackpink; Coldplay; Imagine Dragons; Måneskin; OneRepublic; Panic! at the Disco	
2024	Stray Kids	Dan + Shay; Fuerza Regida; Grupo Frontera; Jonas Brothers; Old Dominion; Paramore; Tomorrow X Together	

== Artists with multiple nominations ==
6 nominations

- Maroon 5
- Imagine Dragons

5 nominations

- BTS
- Coldplay

4 nominations

- Twenty One Pilots
- Panic! at the Disco
- 5 Seconds of Summer
- Jonas Brothers

3 nominations

- One Direction
- Blackpink
- Dan + Shay

2 nominations

- Linkin Park
- OneRepublic
- Fifth Harmony
- The Chainsmokers
- CNCO
- Paramore
