= People's Choice Award for Favorite Music Video =

Pop culture award

People's Choice Awards for Favorite Music Video
- Country: United States
- First award: 2011
- Final award: 2022
- Currently held by: Taylor Swift

Highlights
- Most awards: Katy Perry and BTS (3 each)
- Most nominations: BTS (6)

The People's Choice Awards for Favorite Music Video is one of the awards handed out at the People's Choice Awards. It was first awarded to "Love the Way You Lie" by Eminem featuring Rihanna in 2011. BTS is the most-nominated artist in the category with 6 nominations, and is tied with Katy Perry as the most-awarded artist in the category, having won three times each.

== Recipients ==
Year	Recipient	Nominees	Ref.
2011	Eminem featuring Rihanna – "Love the Way You Lie"	Justin Bieber featuring Ludacris – "Baby"; Katy Perry – "Teenage Dream"; Lady Gaga featuring Beyoncé – "Telephone"; Shakira featuring Freshlyground – "Waka Waka"	
2012	Katy Perry – "Last Friday Night (T.G.I.F.)"	Adele – "Rolling in the Deep"; Beyoncé – "Run The World (Girls)"; Lady Gaga – "Judas"; LMFAO featuring Goonrock and Lauren Bennett – "Party Rock Anthem"	
2013	Katy Perry – "Part of Me"	Carly Rae Jepsen – "Call Me Maybe"; Justin Bieber – "Boyfriend"; Maroon 5 featuring Wiz Khalifa – "Payphone"; Psy – "Gangnam Style"	
2014	Katy Perry – "Roar"	Demi Lovato – "Heart Attack"; Miley Cyrus – "Wrecking Ball"; One Direction – "Best Song Ever"; Pink featuring Nate Ruess – "Just Give Me a Reason"	
No award given between 2015 and 2017
2018	BTS – "Idol"	Ariana Grande – "No Tears Left to Cry"; Camila Cabello – "Never Be the Same"; Childish Gambino – "This Is America"; Selena Gomez – "Back to You"	
2019	Blackpink – "Kill This Love"	Ariana Grande – "7 Rings"; Billie Eilish – "Bad Guy"; BTS featuring Halsey – "Boy with Luv"; Daddy Yankee and Snow – "Con Calma"; Sam Smith and Normani – "Dancing with a Stranger"; Shawn Mendes and Camila Cabello – "Señorita"; Taylor Swift featuring Brendon Urie of Panic! at the Disco – "Me!"	
2020	BTS – "Dynamite"	Blackpink and Selena Gomez – "Ice Cream"; Cardi B featuring Megan Thee Stallion – "WAP"; Future featuring Drake – "Life Is Good"; J Balvin, Dua Lipa, Bad Bunny, and Tainy – "Un Día (One Day)"; Justin Bieber featuring Chance the Rapper – "Holy"; Lady Gaga and Ariana Grande – "Rain on Me"; The Weeknd – "Blinding Lights"	
2021	BTS – "Butter"	Adele – "Easy on Me"; Coldplay and BTS – "My Universe"; Justin Bieber featuring Daniel Caesar and Giveon – "Peaches"; Karol G, Anuel AA, and J Balvin – "Location"; Lil Nas X – "Montero (Call Me By Your Name)"; Olivia Rodrigo – "Good 4 U"; The Kid Laroi and Justin Bieber – "Stay"	
2022	Taylor Swift – "Anti-Hero"	Adele – "Oh My God"; Blackpink – "Pink Venom"; BTS – "Yet to Come (The Most Beautiful Moment)"; Charlie Puth featuring Jungkook of BTS – "Left And Right"; Coldplay and Selena Gomez – "Let Somebody Go"; Harry Styles – "As It Was"; Karol G – "Provenza"	

== Artists with multiple nominations ==
6 nominations

- BTS

5 nominations

- Justin Bieber

4 nominations

- Katy Perry

3 nominations

- Lady Gaga
- Adele
- Ariana Grande
- Selena Gomez
- Blackpink

2 nominations

- Beyoncé
- Camila Cabello
- Taylor Swift
- J Balvin
- Coldplay
- Karol G
