= 48th People's Choice Awards =

Pop culture award show held in 2022

- Date: December 6, 2022
- Location: Barker Hangar; Santa Monica, California
- Country: United States
- Hosted by: Kenan Thompson

Highlights
- Most wins: Film; Doctor Strange in the Multiverse of Madness (3); Television; Stranger Things (3); Music; Taylor Swift (3)
- Most nominations: Film; Nope (6); Television; This Is Us (6); Music; Bad Bunny (7)
- Website: www.votepca.com

Television/radio coverage
- Network: NBC; E!
- Produced by: Barb Bialkowski; Jesse Ignjatovic; Evan Prager

The 48th ceremony of the People's Choice Awards was held on December 6, 2022, at the Barker Hangar in Santa Monica, California. Hosted for a second consecutive year by Kenan Thompson, the show was broadcast live simultaneously on NBC and E!. Nominees spanning 40 categories for film, television, music, and popular culture were announced on October 26. Nope and This Is Us led the Film and Television categories respectively with six nominations each while Bad Bunny led the Music categories with seven.

Doctor Strange in the Multiverse of Madness was the most-awarded Film nominee, winning three awards overall, including The Movie of 2022. Stranger Things topped the Television nominees, also earning three wins, including The Show of 2022. Taylor Swift was the most-awarded nominee in the Music categories, winning the awards for Female Artist, Album, and Music Video of 2022—she won in the last two categories with Midnights (2022) and "Anti-Hero" respectively. Ryan Reynolds was honored with the People's Icon Award, Lizzo received the People's Champion Award and also won The Song of 2022 with "About Damn Time", while Shania Twain was presented with the Music Icon Award.

== Performers ==
Shania Twain and Lauren Spencer-Smith were announced as the show's only performers on December 5, 2022. Twain performed a medley of her most popular songs, including her newest single "Waking Up Dreaming" from her forthcoming sixth studio album Queen of Me (2023), against "an ever-changing backdrop of leopard prints, desert light show and fire". During "That Don't Impress Me Much", the singer changed the "famous spoken-word 'Brad Pitt' line" to instead name-drop Ryan Reynolds who was in attendance as the Icon Award recipient. Multiple media outlets reported Twain's appearance as the highlight of the show, with Rolling Stone writing that the singer "delivered a powerhouse performance" and "owned the stage", while Billboard said that "Twain proved just what makes her a Music Icon". Vulture.com described the performance as "characteristically over-the-top...full of sparkles (all the way up to her top hat), fire, cowgirl dancers, hot men playing instruments", with writer Justin Cuarto further commenting that Twain defended her title as Music Icon and was "still queen of the stage".

List of musical performances
Artist(s)	Song(s)
Lauren Spencer-Smith	"Fingers Crossed"
Shania Twain	Medley "Any Man of Mine" "That Don't Impress Me Much" "Waking Up Dreaming" "Man! I Feel Like a Woman!"

== Presenters ==
Kenan Thompson was announced as the show's host for a second consecutive year, on October 26, 2022. The complete lineup of presenters was revealed on December 5.

- Amy Poehler – presented The Country Artist of 2022
- Sarah Hyland – presented The Drama Movie of 2022
- David Spade – presented The Comedy Movie Star of 2022
- Sarah Michelle Gellar – presented The Competition Contestant of 2022 to Selma Blair
- Billy Porter – introduced and presented the Music Icon Award to Twain
- Dwyane Wade – presented The Male TV Star of 2022
- Nikki Glaser – presented The Nighttime Talk Show of 2022
- Heidi Klum and Michaela Jaé Rodriguez – presented The Reality Show of 2022
- Lil Rel Howery – introduced and presented the People's Icon Award to Ryan Reynolds
- Cast of The Real Housewives of Beverly Hills – presented The Drama TV Star of 2022
- Ana Gasteyer and Niecy Nash – presented The Daytime Talk Show of 2022
- Colin Hanks and Mckenna Grace – presented The Female TV Star of 2022
- Shari Johnson-Jefferson – introduced and presented the People's Champion Award to Lizzo
- The Miz and Maryse Mizanin – introduced Lauren Spencer-Smith
- Chandra Wilson and Sarah Hyland – introduced ..."See Her Now"
- James Corden – presented The Song of 2022
- George Lopez and Mayan Lopez – presented The Drama Show of 2022

== Winners and nominees ==
Nominees were revealed online on October 26, 2022. Voting opened that same day on the PCAs website and Twitter and closed on November 9. In the Film categories, Nope led the nominations with six overall. Following with five apiece are Bullet Train, Top Gun: Maverick and The Adam Project. This Is Us is the most-nominated series in the Television categories, with six, followed by Abbott Elementary, Grey's Anatomy, Law & Order: Special Victims Unit, Saturday Night Live, and Stranger Things, with four each. Bad Bunny led the Music categories with seven nominations, followed by Harry Styles who earned five—Styles garnered six nominations overall, including for The Drama Movie Star of 2022 for his role in Don't Worry Darling.

Winners are listed first and highlighted in bold.

=== Film ===
The Movie of 2022	The Comedy Movie of 2022
**Doctor Strange in the Multiverse of Madness**; The Batman; Bullet Train; Elvis; Jurassic World Dominion; Nope; Thor: Love and Thunder; Top Gun: Maverick	**The Adam Project**; Fire Island; Hocus Pocus 2; Hustle; The Lost City; Marry Me; Senior Year; Ticket To Paradise
The Action Movie of 2022	The Drama Movie of 2022
**Top Gun: Maverick**; The Batman; Black Adam; Bullet Train; Doctor Strange in the Multiverse of Madness; Jurassic World Dominion; Thor: Love and Thunder; The Woman King	**Don't Worry Darling**; Death on the Nile; Elvis; Halloween Ends; Luckiest Girl Alive; Nope; Scream; Where the Crawdads Sing
The Male Movie Star of 2022	The Female Movie Star of 2022
**Chris Hemsworth – Thor: Love and Thunder**; Tom Cruise – Top Gun: Maverick; Dwayne Johnson – Black Adam; Daniel Kaluuya – Nope; Brad Pitt – Bullet Train; Chris Pratt – Jurassic World Dominion; Ryan Reynolds – The Adam Project; Miles Teller – Top Gun: Maverick	**Elizabeth Olsen – Doctor Strange in the Multiverse of Madness**; Viola Davis – The Woman King; Gal Gadot – Death on the Nile; Jennifer Garner – The Adam Project; Joey King – Bullet Train; Jennifer Lopez – Marry Me; Keke Palmer – Nope; Queen Latifah – Hustle
The Drama Movie Star of 2022	The Comedy Movie Star of 2022
**Austin Butler – Elvis**; Jamie Lee Curtis – Halloween Ends; Gal Gadot – Death on the Nile; Daniel Kaluuya – Nope; Mila Kunis – Luckiest Girl Alive; Keke Palmer – Nope; Florence Pugh – Don't Worry Darling; Harry Styles – Don't Worry Darling	**Adam Sandler** – **Hustle**; Sandra Bullock – The Lost City; Jennifer Garner – The Adam Project; Jennifer Lopez – Marry Me; Ryan Reynolds – The Adam Project; Julia Roberts – Ticket To Paradise; Queen Latifah – Hustle; Channing Tatum – The Lost City
The Action Movie Star of 2022
**Elizabeth Olsen – Doctor Strange in the Multiverse of Madness**; Tom Cruise – Top Gun: Maverick; Viola Davis – The Woman King; Chris Hemsworth – Thor: Love and Thunder; Dwayne Johnson – Black Adam; Joey King – Bullet Train; Zoë Kravitz – The Batman; Chris Pratt – Jurassic World Dominion

=== TV ===
The Show of 2022	The Drama Show of 2022
**Stranger Things**; Abbott Elementary; Better Call Saul; Grey's Anatomy; House of the Dragon; Obi-Wan Kenobi; Saturday Night Live; This Is Us	**Grey's Anatomy**; Better Call Saul; Cobra Kai; Euphoria; Law & Order: Special Victims Unit; Ozark; This Is Us; The Walking Dead
The Comedy Show of 2022	The Reality Show of 2022
**Never Have I Ever**; Abbott Elementary; Black-ish; Only Murders in the Building; Saturday Night Live; The Woman in the House Across the Street from the Girl in the Window; Young Rock; Young Sheldon	**The Kardashians**; 90 Day Fiancé: Before the 90 Days; Below Deck Sailing Yacht; Jersey Shore: Family Vacation; Love & Hip Hop: Atlanta; The Real Housewives of Atlanta; The Real Housewives of Beverly Hills; Selling Sunset
The Competition Show of 2022	The Male TV Star of 2022
**The Voice**; America's Got Talent; American Idol; The Bachelorette; Dancing with the Stars; Lizzo's Watch Out for the Big Grrrls; The Masked Singer; RuPaul's Drag Race	**Noah Schnapp – Stranger Things**; Jason Bateman – Ozark; Sterling K. Brown – This Is Us; Ice-T – Law & Order: Special Victims Unit; Oscar Isaac – Moon Knight; Dwayne Johnson – Young Rock; Ewan McGregor – Obi-Wan Kenobi; Norman Reedus – The Walking Dead
The Female TV Star of 2022	The Drama TV Star of 2022
**Ellen Pompeo – Grey's Anatomy**; Kristen Bell – The Woman in the House Across the Street from the Girl in the Window; Millie Bobby Brown – Stranger Things; Quinta Brunson – Abbott Elementary; Selena Gomez – Only Murders in the Building; Mariska Hargitay – Law & Order: Special Victims Unit; Mandy Moore – This Is Us; Maitreyi Ramakrishnan – Never Have I Ever	**Mariska Hargitay – Law & Order: Special Victims Unit**; Jason Bateman – Ozark; Sterling K. Brown – This Is Us; Mandy Moore – This Is Us; Ellen Pompeo – Grey's Anatomy; Norman Reedus – The Walking Dead; Sydney Sweeney – Euphoria; Zendaya – Euphoria
The Comedy TV Star of 2022	The Daytime Talk Show of 2022
**Selena Gomez – Only Murders in the Building**; Kristen Bell – The Woman in the House Across the Street from the Girl in the Window; Quinta Brunson – Abbott Elementary; Dwayne Johnson – Young Rock; Maitreyi Ramakrishnan – Never Have I Ever; Tracee Ellis Ross – Black-ish; Kenan Thompson – Saturday Night Live; Bowen Yang – Saturday Night Live	**The Kelly Clarkson Show**; The Drew Barrymore Show; The Ellen DeGeneres Show; Good Morning America; The Jennifer Hudson Show; Live with Kelly and Ryan; Today with Hoda & Jenna; The View
The Nighttime Talk Show of 2022	The Competition Contestant of 2022
**The Tonight Show Starring Jimmy Fallon**; The Daily Show; Jimmy Kimmel Live!; Last Week Tonight with John Oliver; Late Night with Seth Meyers; The Late Show with Stephen Colbert; The Late Late Show with James Corden; Watch What Happens Live with Andy Cohen	**Selma Blair – Dancing with the Stars**; Bosco – RuPaul's Drag Race; Charli D'Amelio – Dancing with the Stars; The Mayyas – America's Got Talent; Teyana Taylor – The Masked Singer; Noah Thompson – American Idol; Willow Pill – RuPaul's Drag Race; Gabby Windey – The Bachelorette
The Reality TV Star of 2022	The Bingeworthy Show of 2022
**Khloé Kardashian – The Kardashians**; Garcelle Beauvais – The Real Housewives of Beverly Hills; Kandi Burruss – The Real Housewives of Atlanta; Kim Kardashian – The Kardashians; Kenya Moore – The Real Housewives of Atlanta; Kyle Richards – The Real Housewives of Beverly Hills; Mike "The Situation" Sorrentino – Jersey Shore: Family Vacation; Chrishell Stause – Selling Sunset	**Dahmer – Monster: The Jeffrey Dahmer Story**; The Bear; Bel-Air; The Boys; Bridgerton; Inventing Anna; Severance; The Thing About Pam
The Sci-Fi/Fantasy Show of 2022
**Stranger Things**; House of the Dragon; La Brea; The Lord of the Rings: The Rings of Power; Moon Knight; Obi-Wan Kenobi; She-Hulk: Attorney at Law; The Umbrella Academy

=== Music ===
The Male Artist of 2022	The Female Artist of 2022
**Harry Styles**; Bad Bunny; Luke Combs; Drake; Jack Harlow; Kendrick Lamar; Charlie Puth; The Weeknd	**Taylor Swift**; Beyoncé; Camila Cabello; Doja Cat; Lady Gaga; Lizzo; Megan Thee Stallion; Nicki Minaj
The Group of 2022	The Song of 2022
**BTS**; 5 Seconds of Summer; Blackpink; Coldplay; Imagine Dragons; Måneskin; OneRepublic; Panic! at the Disco	**"About Damn Time" – Lizzo**; "As It Was" – Harry Styles; "Break My Soul" – Beyoncé; "First Class" – Jack Harlow; "Hold My Hand" – Lady Gaga; "Me Porto Bonito" – Bad Bunny and Chencho Corleone; "Super Freaky Girl" – Nicki Minaj; "Wait for U" – Future featuring Drake and Tems
The Album of 2022	The Country Artist of 2022
**Midnights – Taylor Swift**; Dawn FM – The Weeknd; Growin' Up – Luke Combs; Harry's House – Harry Styles; Mr. Morale & the Big Steppers – Kendrick Lamar; Renaissance – Beyoncé; Special – Lizzo; Un Verano Sin Ti – Bad Bunny	**Carrie Underwood**; Kelsea Ballerini; Kane Brown; Luke Combs; Miranda Lambert; Maren Morris; Thomas Rhett; Morgan Wallen
The Latin Artist of 2022	The New Artist of 2022
**Becky G**; Anitta; Rauw Alejandro; Bad Bunny; Karol G; Rosalía; Shakira; Sebastián Yatra	**Latto**; Chlöe; Dove Cameron; Gayle; Muni Long; Saucy Santana; Lauren Spencer-Smith; Steve Lacy
The Music Video of 2022	The Collaboration Song of 2022
**"Anti-Hero" – Taylor Swift**; "As It Was" – Harry Styles; "Left and Right" – Charlie Puth featuring Jungkook; "Let Somebody Go" – Coldplay X Selena Gomez; "Oh My God" – Adele; "Pink Venom" – Blackpink; "Provenza" – Karol G; "Yet to Come (The Most Beautiful Moment)" – BTS	**"Left and Right" – Charlie Puth featuring Jungkook**; "Bam Bam" – Camila Cabello featuring Ed Sheeran; "Do We Have a Problem?" – Nicki Minaj X Lil Baby; "Freaky Deaky" – Tyga X Doja Cat; "Hold Me Closer" – Elton John and Britney Spears; "Jimmy Cooks" – Drake featuring 21 Savage; "Party" – Bad Bunny and Rauw Alejandro; "Sweetest Pie" – Megan Thee Stallion and Dua Lipa
The Concert Tour of 2022
**BTS – Permission to Dance on Stage**; Bad Bunny – World's Hottest Tour; Luke Combs – The Middle of Somewhere Tour; Billie Eilish – Happier Than Ever, The World Tour; Lady Gaga – The Chromatica Ball; Dua Lipa – Future Nostalgia Tour; Ed Sheeran – +–=÷x Tour; Harry Styles – Love On Tour

=== Pop culture ===
The Social Celebrity of 2022	The Social Star of 2022
**Selena Gomez**; Bad Bunny; Doja Cat; Lil Nas X; Lizzo; Charlie Puth; Snoop Dogg; Reese Witherspoon	**MrBeast**; Addison Rae; Noah Beck; Charli D'Amelio; Khaby Lame; Mikayla Jane Nogueira; Brent Rivera; Jay Shetty
The Comedy Act of 2022	The Game Changer of 2022
**Kevin Hart – Reality Check**; Whitney Cummings – Jokes (Netflix); Jo Koy – Live from the LA Forum (Netflix); Steve Martin and Martin Short – You Won't Believe What They Look Like Today; Chris Rock – Ego Death World Tour 2022; Amy Schumer – Whore Tour; David Spade – Nothing Personal (Netflix); Wanda Sykes – Stand Out: An LGBTQ+ Celebration (Netflix)	**Serena Williams**; Nathan Chen; Steph Curry; LeBron James; Chloe Kim; Rafael Nadal; Megan Rapinoe; Russell Wilson
The Pop Podcast of 2022	Social Star France 2022
**Archetypes**; Anything Goes with Emma Chamberlain; Armchair Expert with Dax Shepard; Call Her Daddy; Conan O'Brien Needs a Friend; Not Skinny But Not Fat; SmartLess; Why Won't You Date Me? with Nicole Byer	**Leane Marts**; Ilona Aln; Benoit Chevalier; Fabian Crfx; Juju Fitcats; Habi; Rayan Lvtt; Sally
Social Star Brazil 2022
**Virginia Fonseca**; Arthur Aguiar; Iran Ferreira (Luva de Pedreiro); Gloria Groove; Vanessa Lopes; Jade Picon; Luísa Sonza; Yarley

=== Other awards ===
- **People's Icon Award** – **Ryan Reynolds**
- **People's Champion Award** – **Lizzo**
- **Music Icon Award** – **Shania Twain**
