= IHeartRadio Music Award for Best Music Video =

Category in iHeartRadio Music Awards

iHeartRadio Music Award for Best Music Video
- Country: United States
- Presented by: iHeartRadio
- First award: 2017
- Currently held by: Taylor Swift – "The Fate of Ophelia" (2026)

Highlights
- Most awards: BTS (4)
- Most nominations: Cardi B and Taylor Swift (6 each)

The iHeartRadio Music Award for Best Music Video is one of the awards handed out at the yearly iHeartRadio Music Awards. It was first awarded in 2017 and presented to Fifth Harmony for their song "Work From Home". Cardi B and Taylor Swift are the most nominated artists in this category, with a total of six nominations each. BTS are the most awarded artist with four wins, all of which were done consecutively.

== Recipients ==
Year	Winner(s)	Work	Nominees	Ref.
2017	Fifth Harmony featuring Ty Dolla $ign	"Work From Home"	"Can't Stop the Feeling!" – Justin Timberlake; "Don't Let Me Down" – The Chainsmokers featuring Daya; "Formation" – Beyoncé; "Hasta el Amanecer" – Nicky Jam; "Heathens" – Twenty One Pilots; "Hymn for the Weekend" – Coldplay; "I Took a Pill in Ibiza (SeeB Remix)" – Mike Posner; "Side to Side" – Ariana Grande featuring Nicki Minaj; "This Is What You Came For" – Calvin Harris featuring Rihanna; "Work" – Rihanna featuring Drake; "Pillowtalk" – Zayn	
2018	Harry Styles	"Sign of the Times"	"Bad Liar" – Selena Gomez; "Bodak Yellow" – Cardi B; "Despacito" – Luis Fonsi and Daddy Yankee; "I'm the One" – DJ Khaled featuring Justin Bieber, Quavo, Chance the Rapper and Lil Wayne; "Look What You Made Me Do" – Taylor Swift; "Malibu" – Miley Cyrus; "New Rules" – Dua Lipa; "Shape of You" – Ed Sheeran; "Sorry Not Sorry" – Demi Lovato; "Swish Swish" – Katy Perry featuring Nicki Minaj; "That's What I Like" – Bruno Mars; "There's Nothing Holdin' Me Back" – Shawn Mendes	
2019	Taylor Swift	"Delicate"	"Thank U, Next" – Ariana Grande; "Finesse" – Bruno Mars featuring Cardi B; "One Kiss" – Calvin Harris and Dua Lipa; "I Like It" – Cardi B, Bad Bunny and J Balvin; "This Is America" – Childish Gambino; "Dura" – Daddy Yankee; "God's Plan" – Drake; "Freaky Friday" – Lil Dicky featuring Chris Brown; "Girls Like You" – Maroon 5 featuring Cardi B; "Psycho" – Post Malone featuring Ty Dolla Sign; "Taki Taki" – DJ Snake featuring Selena Gomez, Ozuna and Cardi B	
2020	BTS featuring Halsey	"Boy with Luv"	"7 Rings" – Ariana Grande; "Bad Guy" – Billie Eilish; "Con Altura" – Rosalía, J Balvin featuring El Guincho; "Con Calma" – Daddy Yankee and Snow; "Dancing With A Stranger" – Sam Smith and Normani; "I Don't Care" – Ed Sheeran and Justin Bieber; "Kill This Love" – Blackpink; "Me!" – Taylor Swift featuring Brendon Urie; "Old Town Road" – Lil Nas X featuring Billy Ray Cyrus; "Señorita" – Shawn Mendes and Camila Cabello; "Sucker" – Jonas Brothers	
2021	BTS	"Dynamite"	"Blinding Lights" – The Weeknd; "Don't Start Now" – Dua Lipa; "Hawái" – Maluma; "How You Like That" – Blackpink; "Life Is Good" – Future featuring Drake; "Rain on Me" – Lady Gaga and Ariana Grande; "WAP" – Cardi B featuring Megan Thee Stallion; "Watermelon Sugar" – Harry Styles; "Yummy" – Justin Bieber	
2022	BTS	"Butter"	"Bad Habits" – Ed Sheeran; "Build a Bitch" – Bella Poarch; "Drivers License" – Olivia Rodrigo; "Kiss Me More" – Doja Cat featuring SZA; "Leave the Door Open" – Silk Sonic (Bruno Mars and Anderson .Paak); "Montero (Call Me By Your Name)" – Lil Nas X; "Peaches" – Justin Bieber featuring Daniel Caesar and Giveon; "Save Your Tears" – The Weeknd; "Stay" – The Kid Laroi and Justin Bieber	
2023	BTS	"Yet to Come (The Most Beautiful Moment)"	"Anti-Hero" – Taylor Swift; "As It Was" – Harry Styles; "Calm Down" – Rema and Selena Gomez; "Don't Be Shy" – Tiësto and Karol G; "Don't You Worry" – Black Eyed Peas, Shakira and David Guetta; "Envolver" – Anitta; "Left and Right" – Charlie Puth featuring Jung Kook; "Pink Venom" – Blackpink; "Tití Me Preguntó" – Bad Bunny	
2024	Jung Kook featuring Latto	"Seven"	"3D" – Jung Kook featuring Jack Harlow; "Dance the Night" – Dua Lipa; "Flower" – Jisoo; "Flowers" – Miley Cyrus; "I'm Good (Blue)" – Bebe Rexha and David Guetta; "Kill Bill" – SZA; "La Bebé (Remix)" – Yng Lvcas and Peso Pluma; "Paint the Town Red" – Doja Cat; "TQG" – Karol G and Shakira; "Vampire" – Olivia Rodrigo; "What Was I Made For?" – Billie Eilish	
2025	Taylor Swift featuring Post Malone	"Fortnight"	"APT." – Rosé and Bruno Mars; "Beautiful Things" – Benson Boone; "Die with a Smile" – Lady Gaga and Bruno Mars; "Espresso" – Sabrina Carpenter; "Houdini" – Dua Lipa; "Houdini" – Eminem; "I Had Some Help" – Post Malone featuring Morgan Wallen; "Luna" – ATL Jacob and Feid; "Not Like Us" – Kendrick Lamar; "Please Please Please" – Sabrina Carpenter; "Rockstar" – Lisa	
2026	Taylor Swift	"The Fate of Ophelia"	"Abracadabra" – Lady Gaga; "Baile Inolvidable" – Bad Bunny; "Born Again" – Lisa featuring Doja Cat and Raye; "Gabriela" – Katseye; "Jump" – Blackpink; "Like Jennie" – Jennie; "Manchild" – Sabrina Carpenter; "Ordinary" – Alex Warren; "Sapphire" – Ed Sheeran; "Shake It to the Max (Fly) (Remix)" – Moliy, Shenseea, Skillibeng and Silent Addy; "Toxic Till the End" – Rosé	

== Artists with multiple nominations ==
6 nominations

- Cardi B
- Taylor Swift

5 nominations

- Justin Bieber
- Bruno Mars
- Dua Lipa

4 nominations

- Ariana Grande
- BTS
- Blackpink
- Ed Sheeran

3 nominations

- Daddy Yankee
- Drake
- Harry Styles
- Selena Gomez
- Jungkook
- Post Malone
- Lady Gaga
- Bad Bunny
- Doja Cat
- Sabrina Carpenter

2 nominations

- Rihanna
- Nicki Minaj
- Ty Dolla Sign
- Calvin Harris
- J Balvin
- Shawn Mendes
- The Weeknd
- Miley Cyrus
- David Guetta
- SZA
- Karol G
- Shakira
- Olivia Rodrigo
- Billie Eilish
- Lisa
- Rosé
