= 45th People's Choice Awards =

Pop culture award show held in 2019

- Date: November 10, 2019
- Location: Barker Hangar; Santa Monica, California
- Country: United States

Highlights
- Most wins: Film: Avengers: Endgame (3); TV: Stranger Things (3); Music: Blackpink (3)
- Most nominations: Film: Avengers: Endgame (7); TV: Game of Thrones (8); Music: Ariana Grande (6)
- Website: pca.eonline.com

Television/radio coverage
- Network: E! Simulcast partners: Bravo; Syfy; USA Network

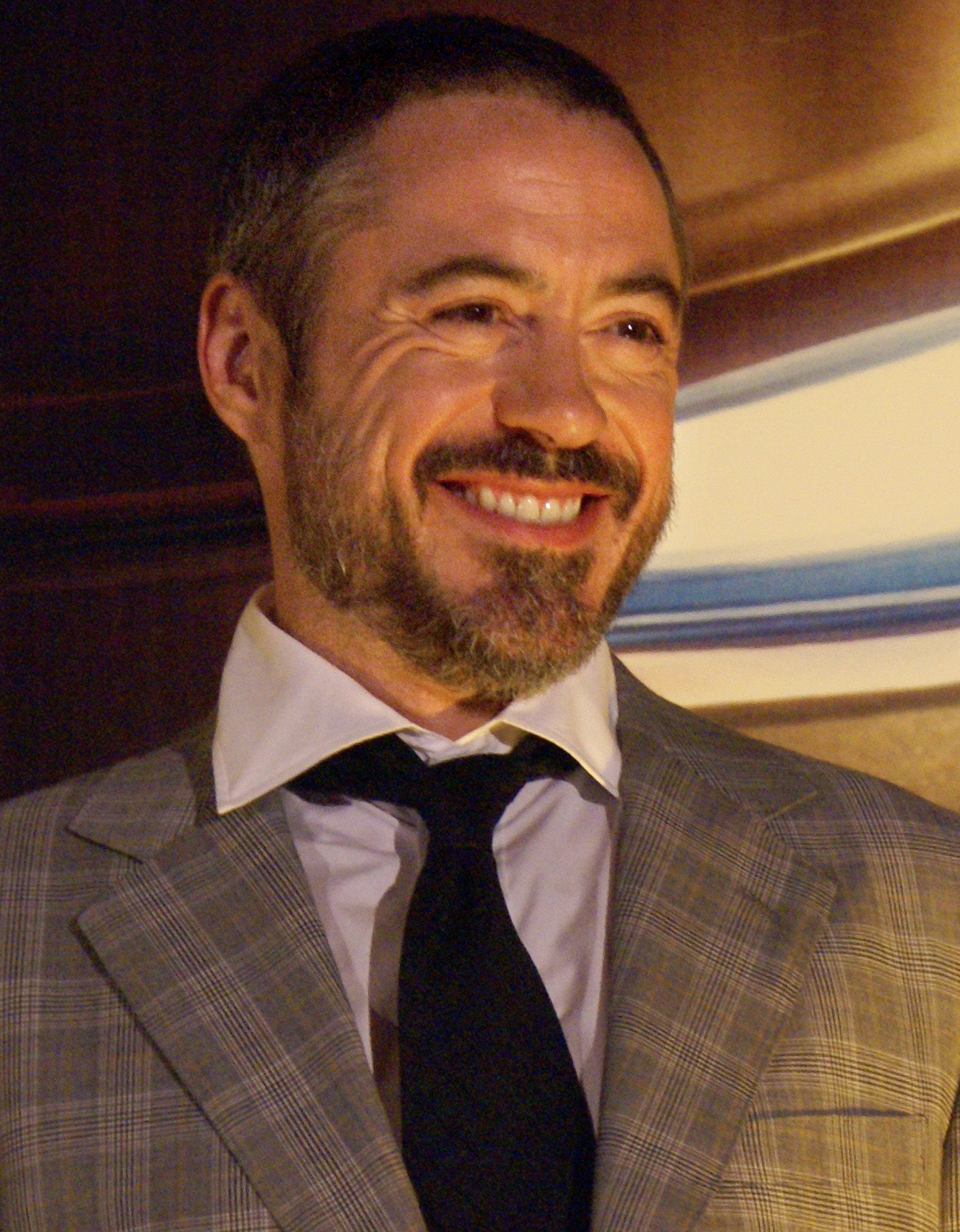
Actor Robert Downey Jr., 2008

The 45th ceremony of the People's Choice Awards was held on November 10, 2019, to honor the best in popular culture for 2019.

== Performers ==
- Alessia Cara - "Rooting for You"
- Kelsea Ballerini - "Club"

== Winners and nominees ==
The first round of nominees was announced in August, with the finalists named on September 4.

=== Film ===
The Movie of 2019	The Comedy Movie of 2019
Avengers: Endgame; Captain Marvel; Fast & Furious Presents: Hobbs & Shaw; John Wick: Chapter 3 – Parabellum; The Lion King; Spider-Man: Far From Home; Toy Story 4; Us	Murder Mystery; Good Boys; The Hustle; Little; Long Shot; Men in Black: International; The Upside; Yesterday
The Action Movie of 2019	The Drama Movie of 2019
Avengers: Endgame; Captain Marvel; Dark Phoenix; Godzilla: King of the Monsters; Fast & Furious Presents: Hobbs & Shaw; John Wick: Chapter 3 – Parabellum; Shazam!; Spider-Man: Far From Home	After; Extremely Wicked, Shockingly Evil and Vile; Five Feet Apart; Glass; Once Upon a Time in Hollywood; Rocketman; Triple Frontier; Us
The Family Movie of 2019	The Drama Movie Star of 2019
Aladdin; The Angry Birds Movie 2; How to Train Your Dragon: The Hidden World; The Lego Movie 2: The Second Part; The Lion King; Pokémon: Detective Pikachu; The Secret Life of Pets 2; Toy Story 4	Cole Sprouse – Five Feet Apart; Leonardo DiCaprio – Once Upon a Time in Hollywood; Taron Egerton – Rocketman; Zac Efron – Extremely Wicked, Shockingly Evil and Vile; Samuel L. Jackson – Glass; Lupita Nyong'o – Us; Sarah Paulson – Glass; Brad Pitt – Once Upon a Time in Hollywood
The Male Movie Star of 2019	The Female Movie Star of 2019
Robert Downey Jr. – Avengers: Endgame; Chris Hemsworth – Avengers: Endgame; Tom Holland – Spider-Man: Far From Home; Samuel L. Jackson – Captain Marvel; Dwayne Johnson – Fast & Furious Presents: Hobbs & Shaw; Keanu Reeves – John Wick: Chapter 3 – Parabellum; Adam Sandler – Murder Mystery; Will Smith – Aladdin	Zendaya – Spider-Man: Far From Home; Jennifer Aniston – Murder Mystery; Millie Bobby Brown – Godzilla: King of the Monsters; Scarlett Johansson – Avengers: Endgame; Brie Larson – Captain Marvel; Lupita Nyong'o – Us; Tessa Thompson – Men in Black: International; Sophie Turner – Dark Phoenix
The Comedy Movie Star of 2019	The Action Movie Star of 2019
Noah Centineo – The Perfect Date; Kevin Hart – The Upside; Liam Hemsworth – Isn’t It Romantic; Dwayne Johnson – Fighting with My Family; Mindy Kaling – Late Night; Adam Sandler – Murder Mystery; Rebel Wilson – The Hustle and Isn’t It Romantic; Ali Wong – Always Be My Maybe	Tom Holland – Spider-Man: Far From Home; Halle Berry – John Wick: Chapter 3 – Parabellum; Robert Downey Jr. – Avengers: Endgame; Chris Evans – Avengers: Endgame; Dwayne Johnson – Fast & Furious Presents: Hobbs & Shaw; Brie Larson – Captain Marvel; Keanu Reeves – John Wick: Chapter 3 – Parabellum; Sophie Turner – Dark Phoenix
The Animated Movie Star of 2019
Beyoncé – The Lion King; Awkwafina – The Angry Birds Movie 2; America Ferrera – How to Train Your Dragon: The Hidden World; Tiffany Haddish – The Lego Movie 2: The Second Part and The Secret Life of Pets 2; Tom Hanks – Toy Story 4; Kevin Hart – The Secret Life of Pets 2; Chris Pratt – The Lego Movie 2: The Second Part; Ryan Reynolds – Pokémon: Detective Pikachu

=== TV ===
The Show of 2019	The Drama Show of 2019
Stranger Things; The Big Bang Theory; Game of Thrones; Grey's Anatomy; Riverdale; This Is Us; The Walking Dead; WWE Raw	Stranger Things; Big Little Lies; Chicago P.D.; Game of Thrones; Grey's Anatomy; Riverdale; This Is Us; The Walking Dead
The Comedy Show of 2019	The Reality Show of 2019
The Big Bang Theory; The Good Place; Grown-ish; Modern Family; Orange Is the New Black; Saturday Night Live; Schitt's Creek; Veep	Keeping Up with the Kardashians; Bachelor in Paradise; Jersey Shore: Family Vacation; Love & Hip Hop: Atlanta; The Real Housewives of Atlanta; The Real Housewives of Beverly Hills; Queer Eye; Vanderpump Rules
The Competition Show of 2019	The Male TV Star of 2019
America's Got Talent; American Idol; The Bachelor; The Bachelorette; The Challenge; The Masked Singer; RuPaul's Drag Race; The Voice	Cole Sprouse — Riverdale; KJ Apa — Riverdale; Sterling K. Brown — This Is Us; Kit Harington — Game of Thrones; Norman Reedus — The Walking Dead; Jim Parsons — The Big Bang Theory; Milo Ventimiglia — This Is Us; Finn Wolfhard — Stranger Things
The Female TV Star of 2019	The Drama TV Star of 2019
Millie Bobby Brown — Stranger Things; Danai Gurira — The Walking Dead; Camila Mendes — Riverdale; Mandy Moore — This Is Us; Lili Reinhart — Riverdale; Sophie Turner — Game of Thrones; Maisie Williams — Game of Thrones; Reese Witherspoon — Big Little Lies	Zendaya — Euphoria; Millie Bobby Brown — Stranger Things; Sterling K. Brown — This Is Us; Norman Reedus — The Walking Dead; Lili Reinhart — Riverdale; Sophie Turner — Game of Thrones; Maisie Williams — Game of Thrones; Reese Witherspoon — Big Little Lies
The Comedy TV Star of 2019	The Daytime Talk Show of 2019
Kristen Bell — The Good Place; Tiffany Haddish — The Last O.G.; Jameela Jamil — The Good Place; Leslie Jones — Saturday Night Live; Julia Louis-Dreyfus — Veep; Tracee Ellis Ross — Black-ish; Yara Shahidi — Grown-ish; Jim Parsons — The Big Bang Theory	The Ellen DeGeneres Show; Good Morning America; Live with Kelly and Ryan; The Real; Red Table Talk; Today; The View; The Wendy Williams Show
The Nighttime Talk Show of 2019	The Competition Contestant of 2019
The Tonight Show Starring Jimmy Fallon; The Daily Show with Trevor Noah; Full Frontal with Samantha Bee; Jimmy Kimmel Live!; Last Week Tonight with John Oliver; The Late Late Show with James Corden; The Late Show with Stephen Colbert; Watch What Happens Live with Andy Cohen	Hannah Brown — The Bachelorette; Tyler Cameron — The Bachelorette; Kodi Lee — America's Got Talent; Vanessa Vanjie Mateo — RuPaul's Drag Race; Tyler Oakley — The Amazing Race; T-Pain — The Masked Singer; Colton Underwood — The Bachelor; Buddy Valastro — Buddy Vs. Duff
The Reality TV Star of 2019	The Bingeworthy Show of 2019
Khloé Kardashian — Keeping Up with the Kardashians; Kandi Burruss — The Real Housewives of Atlanta; Kylie Jenner — Keeping Up with the Kardashians; NeNe Leakes — The Real Housewives of Atlanta; Antoni Porowski — Queer Eye; Kyle Richards — The Real Housewives of Beverly Hills; Jonathan Van Ness — Queer Eye; Lisa Vanderpump — The Real Housewives of Beverly Hills	Outlander; 13 Reasons Why; Game of Thrones; Law & Order: Special Victims Unit; Orange Is the New Black; Queer Eye; Stranger Things; The Umbrella Academy
The Sci-Fi/Fantasy Show of 2019
Shadowhunters; The 100; Arrow; Chilling Adventures of Sabrina; The Flash; Supernatural; Stranger Things; The Umbrella Academy

=== Music ===
The Male Artist of 2019	The Female Artist of 2019
Shawn Mendes; Bad Bunny; Drake; Khalid; Lil Nas X; Post Malone; Ed Sheeran; Travis Scott	Billie Eilish; Camila Cabello; Cardi B; Miley Cyrus; Ariana Grande; Halsey; Katy Perry; Taylor Swift
The Group of 2019	The Song of 2019
Blackpink; 5 Seconds of Summer; BTS; The Chainsmokers; CNCO; Imagine Dragons; Jonas Brothers; Panic! at the Disco	"Señorita" – Shawn Mendes & Camila Cabello; "7 Rings" – Ariana Grande; "Bad Guy" – Billie Eilish; "Dancing with a Stranger" – Sam Smith & Normani; "I Don’t Care" – Ed Sheeran & Justin Bieber; "Old Town Road" – Lil Nas X feat. Billy Ray Cyrus; "Sucker" – Jonas Brothers; "Never Really Over" – Katy Perry
The Album of 2019	The Country Artist of 2019
Lover – Taylor Swift; Cuz I Love You – Lizzo; Death Race for Love – Juice Wrld; Free Spirit – Khalid; Happiness Begins – Jonas Brothers; No.6 Collaborations Project – Ed Sheeran; Thank U, Next – Ariana Grande; When We All Fall Asleep, Where Do We Go? – Billie Eilish	Blake Shelton; Kelsea Ballerini; Kane Brown; Luke Bryan; Luke Combs; Maren Morris; Thomas Rhett; Carrie Underwood
The Latin Artist of 2019	The Music Video of 2019
Becky G; Anuel AA; Bad Bunny; Daddy Yankee; Karol G; J Balvin; Maluma; Natti Natasha	"Kill This Love" – Blackpink; "7 Rings" – Ariana Grande; "Bad Guy" – Billie Eilish; "Boy with Luv" – BTS feat. Halsey; "Con Calma" – Daddy Yankee & Snow; "Dancing with a Stranger" – Sam Smith & Normani; "ME!" – Taylor Swift feat. Brendon Urie of Panic! At The Disco; "Señorita" – Shawn Mendes & Camila Cabello
The Concert Tour of 2019
In Your Area World Tour – Blackpink; Beautiful Trauma World Tour – Pink; It’s My Party – Jennifer Lopez; Here We Go Again Tour – Cher; Love Yourself World Tour – BTS; Enigma – Lady Gaga; The Man of the Woods Tour – Justin Timberlake; Sweetener World Tour – Ariana Grande

=== Pop culture ===
The Social Star of 2019	The Beauty Influencer of 2019
David Dobrik; The Ace Family; Emma Chamberlain; Shane Dawson; The Dolan Twins; Liza Koshy; Tana Mongeau; Rickey Thompson	Bretman Rock; Jackie Aina; James Charles; Nikita Dragun; NikkieTutorials – Nikkie de Jager; Desi Perkins; RCL Beauty – Rachel Levin; Jeffree Star
The Social Celebrity of 2019	The Animal Star of 2019
Ellen DeGeneres; Justin Bieber; Cardi B; Miley Cyrus; Ariana Grande; Kim Kardashian; Shawn Mendes; Taylor Swift	Doug the Pug; Juniper The Fox; Jiffpom; Lil BUB; Nala Cat; Shinjiro Ono – Marutaro; tecuaniventura; Tuna The Chiweenie
The Comedy Act of 2019	The Style Star of 2019
Kevin Hart: Irresponsible – Kevin Hart; Celebrity Project; Gabriel "Fluffy" Iglesias: One Show Fits All – Gabriel "Fluffy" Iglesias; Ken Jeong: You Complete Me, Ho – Ken Jeong; Trevor Noah Tour – Trevor Noah; Joe Rogan Show– Joe Rogan; Amy Schumer: Growing– Amy Schumer; Miranda Sings Live... Your Welcome – Colleen Ballinger; Wanda Sykes: Not Normal – Wanda Sykes	Harry Styles; Cardi B; Celine Dion; Gigi Hadid; Lady Gaga; Jennifer Lopez; Rihanna; Kim Kardashian West
The Game Changer of 2019	The Pop Podcast of 2019
Simone Biles Historic and first female Triple Double & 6th all-around title; Drew Brees Surpassed Peyton Manning’s record; Stephen Curry NBA - Charity; Coco Gauff Beat Venus Williams – Amazing Wimbledon debut; LeBron James NBA - Charity; Alex Morgan U.S. Women’s Soccer - Equal Pay; Megan Rapinoe U.S. Women’s Soccer - Equal Pay; Serena Williams Charity and Female Empowerment	Scrubbing In with Becca Tilley and Tanya Rad; Armchair Expert Podcast with Dax Shepard; Bitch Sesh: A Real Housewives Breakdown with Casey Wilson and Danielle Schneider; Getting Curious with Jonathan Van Ness; Off the Vine with Kaitlyn Bristowe; The Joe Rogan Experience; Whine Down with Jana Kramer; WTF with Marc Maron

=== Other ===
==== People's Icon of 2019 ====
- Jennifer Aniston

==== Most Inspiring Asian Woman of 2019 ====
- CL

==== Fashion Icon of 2019 ====
- Gwen Stefani

==== People's Champion of 2019 ====
- Pink
