= Kill This Love (song) =

- Promotional graphic

Single by Blackpink

from the EP Kill This Love
- Language: Korean; English
- Released: April 4, 2019
- Studio: The Black Label (Seoul)
- Genre: Electropop; EDM trap
- Length: 3:09
- Label: YG; Interscope
- Songwriters: Teddy; Bekuh Boom
- Producers: Teddy; R. Tee; Bekuh Boom; 24

Blackpink singles chronology
"Ddu-Du Ddu-Du" (2018)	"Kill This Love" (2019)	"How You Like That" (2020)

Music video
- "Kill This Love" on YouTube

"Kill This Love" is a song recorded by South Korean girl group Blackpink. It was released on April 4, 2019, through YG Entertainment and Interscope Records, as the lead single for the group's second Korean extended play of the same name. The Japanese version of the single was released through Universal Music Japan on October 16, 2019. It was written by Teddy and Bekuh Boom and produced by them alongside R. Tee and 24. The single has been described as an electropop song, whose lyrics talk about the girls' decision to end a toxic relationship.

Commercially, "Kill This Love" peaked at number two on the Gaon Digital Chart and the Billboard K-pop Hot 100 in South Korea. The song became the group's first top-50 hit on the US Billboard Hot 100 and the UK Singles Chart, thus also becoming the highest-charting song by a female K-pop act on both charts. It reached number one in Malaysia as well as on Billboard World Digital Songs, and entered the national charts in 27 countries. The song has been certified double diamond in Brazil, platinum in South Korea, Japan, Australia, France, and New Zealand, and silver in the United Kingdom, among others.

An accompanying music video for the song was directed by Seo Hyun-seung and uploaded onto Blackpink's YouTube channel simultaneously with the single's release. Upon release, it broke the record for the most-viewed music video within 24 hours, accumulating 56.7 million views in that time. It has since become the second music video by a K-pop group to reach two billion views after "Ddu-Du Ddu-Du" (2018), making Blackpink the first K-pop act in history to have two videos reach the milestone. It also became one of the most-liked videos on YouTube with over 25 million likes on the platform, and won the Music Video of 2019 award at the 45th People's Choice Awards.

== Background and release ==
Yang Hyun-suk, then-CEO of YG announced on February 8, 2019, that Blackpink was set for a comeback with an EP in March. The single and EP were announced on March 25. Between March 31 and April 1, multiple individual teaser pictures were posted onto their social media accounts. On July 26, it was announced that the group would release a Japanese version of their EP Kill This Love on September 11, 2019. The album missed its initial release date and was released on October 16, 2019. No song of the version was released as a single. A live recording of the Japanese version of "Kill This Love", recorded in the Tokyo Dome on December 4, 2019, was included in the group's third live album Blackpink 2019–2020 World Tour In Your Area – Tokyo Dome, released on May 6, 2020, through Universal Music Japan.

== Composition ==
"Kill This Love"
A 17-second sample of "Kill This Love", described as a stomping, brassy electropop track with trap elements.

The song was written by Teddy and Bekuh Boom, who previously wrote "Ddu-Du Ddu-Du", while production was handled by them alongside R. Tee and 24. Its lyrics have been described as a "breakup anthem" and the song itself has been described as a stomping, brassy electropop track with trap elements. The song contains "blaring horns and martial percussion", with Rosé and Jisoo leading the "impassioned" pre-choruses about breaking up. The song ends with an "imperial rallying cry to cut off the dead weight".

== Critical reception ==
"Kill This Love" received mixed reviews from music critics. Erica Russell from Paper gave a glowing review, ranking "Kill This Love" as the best song of 2019 and praised it as a "perfect" sonic blend of all the group members and an "explosive culmination" of the musical trends that dominated the past decade. J.M.K from Billboard ranked it 25th on their list of the best K-pop songs of 2019, remarking that the group's "girl crush' concept never felt more visceral". In another Billboard article, staff writer Andrew Unterberger placed the song 66th in the year's best songs and described the production as "practically biblical". Yannik Gölz from Laut.de regarded the track as a "sensory overload" and felt that it "delivers everything you would want from Blackpink". He characterized it as "spectacular, cartoon-like and overdrawn trap-pop packed to the point of irritation", but also expressed a desire for a more suitable hook.

Conversely, Michelle Kim from Pitchfork gave it an unfavorable review, describing the song's production as strangely out of date and suggesting it could have been produced in the early 2010s. She drew parallels between the song and Taylor Swift's 2015 single "Bad Blood", albeit without a "catchy Swiftian hook". Rhian Daly from NME expressed disappointment with the track's production, labelling the chorus as uninspiring and a letdown following the song's initial buildup. Nur Izzaty Shaifullizan from The Star made comparisons to the group's 2018 hit "Ddu-Du Ddu-Du" and felt that it was hardly an improvement.

Year-end lists for "Kill This Love"
Publication	List	Rank	Ref.
Billboard	The 100 Best Songs of 2019	66	
Billboard	The 25 Best K-pop Songs of 2019	21	
Pitchfork	The 20 Best Music Videos of 2019	14	
BuzzFeed	Best K-pop Music Videos of 2019	9	
Paper	Paper's Top 50 Songs of 2019	1	
Refinery29	The Best K-Pop Songs of 2019	17	
Rolling Stone India	10 Best K-pop Music Videos of 2019	—	
SCMP	The 10 best K-pop songs of 2019	2	
YouTube	Top 10 Most-Watched MVs of 2019 Within Korea	4	

== Commercial performance ==
In South Korea "Kill This Love" debuted at number 25 on the Gaon Digital Chart with only one and a half days of charting, later peaking at number two the second week, giving the group their sixth top five song. In the United States, the single debuted at number 41 on the Billboard Hot 100 to become the highest-charting Hot 100 hit ever by a K-pop girl group. The song debuted at number 22 on the Streaming Songs chart with 18.6 million streams and rose 48–39 on the Digital Song Sales chart with 7,000 downloads sold. The song stayed in the Hot 100 for a total of four consecutive weeks, making it the longest-charting song by an all-female Korean act on the chart. In the United Kingdom, "Kill This Love" charted at number 33, the highest for any female Korean act at the time. In May 2021, the song was certified silver by the British Phonographic Industry (BPI) for moving 200,000 single-equivalent units, the group's first solo single to do so. The track reached 43.1 million streams in the UK as of September 2022, becoming the group's second most streamed song in the country. In 2026, "Kill This Love" surpassed 1 billion streams on Spotify, making Blackpink the first female K-pop act to have multiple songs exceed the milestone following "How You Like That" (2020).

== Accolades ==
Awards and nominations for "Kill This Love"
Year	Organization	Award	Result	Ref.
2019	BreakTudo Awards	Boom Video of the Year	Won	
2019	BreakTudo Awards	International Music Video of the Year	Won	
2019	Melon Music Awards	Best Rap/Hip Hop Track	Nominated	
2019	Mnet Asian Music Awards	Song of the Year	Nominated	
2019	Mnet Asian Music Awards	Best Dance Performance Female Group	Nominated	
2019	MTV Video Music Awards	Best K-Pop	Nominated	
2019	People's Choice Awards	The Music Video of 2019	Won	
2020	Gaon Chart Music Awards	Artist of the Year – Digital Music (April)	Nominated	
2020	Golden Disc Awards	Best Digital Song (Bonsang)	Nominated	
2020	iHeartRadio Music Awards	Favorite Music Video Choreography (Note: Choreographers: Kyle Hanagami and Kiel Tutin)	Won	
2020	iHeartRadio Music Awards	Best Music Video	Nominated	

Music program awards
Program	Date	Ref.
Inkigayo	April 21, 2019	
Inkigayo	May 26, 2019	

== Music video ==
KBS banned the music video as member Rosé is seen driving a car without a seatbelt.

An accompanying music video for the song was directed by Seo Hyun-seung and shot in mid-March, and was released on YouTube simultaneously with the song. According to Billboard, the visual features a variety of weapons, ranging from a car being driven with an intent to kill, to a giant hunting trap. The music video also features elements of Greek mythology, such as the fractured Aphrodite statue serving as a metaphor for broken love, and features references to Christianity regarding the ecclesiastical setting.

Upon the music video's release, "Kill This Love" broke the record of the fastest video to reach 1 million likes in just 28 minutes. It earned the biggest music video debut in YouTube history with 56.7 million views within 24 hours of release, surpassing the record held by Ariana Grande's "Thank U, Next" (2018). Furthermore, it became the fastest video to reach 100 million views on YouTube, doing so in approximately 2 days and 14 hours, beating the record set by fellow Korean artist Psy with "Gentleman" in 2013. It also set the record for the biggest YouTube premiere with 979,000 concurrent viewers. "Kill This Love" surpassed two billion views in September 2024, marking the group's second video to hit the milestone after "Ddu-Du Ddu-Du".

On April 9, 2019, the dance practice video for "Kill This Love" was released on Blackpink's official YouTube channel. South Korean public broadcaster KBS banned the music video "for violating the country's Road Traffic Act", due to a scene in which Rosé is seen driving a car at high speed without a seatbelt.

== Live performances ==
Blackpink promoted the song on several music programs in South Korea including Show! Music Core and Inkigayo. "Kill This Love" and other songs of the same-titled EP were performed at the Coachella Valley Music and Arts Festival in Indio, California on April 12, 2019. The song was added to the set list of Blackpink's In Your Area World Tour between April 2019 and the tour's conclusion in February 2020.

On January 31, 2021, the group performed "Kill This Love" as the opening number of their virtual concert The Show. Billboard praised the reworking of the song with a live band accompanying them and deemed it one of the standout moments of the show. Blackpink also included the song on the setlist of their second worldwide concert tour, the Born Pink World Tour (2022–2023). In April and June 2023, they performed "Kill This Love" during their headlining sets at Coachella and BST Hyde Park in London.

== Charts ==
=== Weekly charts ===
Weekly chart performance for "Kill This Love"
Chart (2019–20)	Peak position
Argentina (Argentina Hot 100)	42
Austria (Ö3 Austria Top 40)	45
Belgium (Ultratip Bubbling Under Flanders)	22
Belgium (Ultratip Bubbling Under Wallonia)	31
Canada Hot 100 (Billboard)	11
Czech Republic Singles Digital (ČNS IFPI)	26
Estonia (Eesti Tipp-40)	9
Finland Digital Song Sales (Billboard)	9
France (SNEP)	126
Germany (GfK)	58
Global 200 (Billboard)	181
Greece (IFPI)	23
Hungary (Single Top 40)	7
Hungary (Stream Top 40)	12
Ireland (IRMA)	30
Japan (Japan Hot 100)	6
Japan Combined Singles (Oricon)	20
Latvia (LAIPA)	16
Lithuania (AGATA)	9
Malaysia (RIM)	1
Mexico Airplay (Billboard)	40
Netherlands (Single Top 100)	83
Netherlands (Global Top 40)	4
New Zealand (Recorded Music NZ)	24
Portugal (AFP)	42
Russia (Tophit)	17
Scotland Singles (Official Charts)	40
Singapore (RIAS)	13
Slovakia Singles Digital (ČNS IFPI)	22
South Korea (K-pop Hot 100)	2
South Korea (Gaon)	2
Spain (Promusicae)	55
Sweden (Sverigetopplistan)	56
Switzerland (Schweizer Hitparade)	45
UK Singles (Official Charts)	33
US Billboard Hot 100	41
US World Digital Song Sales (Billboard)	1

=== Monthly charts ===
Monthly chart performance for "Kill This Love"
Chart (2019)	Peak position
South Korea (Gaon)	4

=== Year-end charts ===
Year-end chart performance for "Kill This Love"
Chart (2019)	Position
Japan (Japan Hot 100)	60
Malaysia (RIM)	7
South Korea (Gaon)	45
US World Digital Songs (Billboard)	3

Note: In Australia, the EP ranked at number 18 on the singles chart, but the single was not recognised separately.

== Certifications ==
Certifications for "Kill This Love"
Region	Certification	Certified units/sales
Australia (ARIA)	Platinum	70,000^{‡}
Brazil (Pro-Música Brasil)	2× Diamond	320,000^{‡}
France (SNEP)	Platinum	200,000^{‡}
New Zealand (RMNZ)	Platinum	30,000^{‡}
Poland (ZPAV)	Gold	10,000^{‡}
Portugal (AFP)	Gold	5,000^{‡}
Spain (Promusicae)	Gold	30,000^{‡}
United Kingdom (BPI)	Silver	200,000^{‡}
Streaming
Japan (RIAJ)	Platinum	100,000,000^{†}
South Korea (KMCA)	Platinum	100,000,000^{†}
^{‡} Sales+streaming figures based on certification alone.^{†} Streaming-only figures based on certification alone.

== Release history ==
Release dates and formats for "Kill This Love"
Region	Date	Version	Format	Label	Ref.
Various	April 4, 2019	Korean	Digital download; streaming	YG; Interscope	
Italy	April 19, 2019	Korean	Contemporary hit radio	Universal	
United States	May 7, 2019	Korean	Contemporary hit radio	Interscope	
Japan	October 28, 2019	Japanese	Digital download; streaming	Interscope	

== See also ==
- List of best-selling girl group singles
- List of certified songs in South Korea
- List of Inkigayo Chart winners (2019)
- List of K-pop songs on the Billboard charts
- List of most-liked YouTube videos
- List of number-one songs of 2019 (Malaysia)
- List of viral music videos
