= How You Like That =

- Digital cover

Single by Blackpink

from the album The Album
- Language: Korean; English
- Released: June 26, 2020
- Studio: The Black Label (Seoul)
- Genre: Pop; hip hop; trap; EDM
- Length: 3:01
- Label: YG; Interscope
- Composers: Teddy; R.Tee; 24
- Lyricists: Teddy; Danny Chung
- Producers: Teddy; R.Tee; 24

Blackpink singles chronology
"Kill This Love" (2019)	"How You Like That" (2020)	"Ice Cream" (2020)

Music video
- "How You Like That" on YouTube "How You Like That (JP Ver.)" on YouTube

"How You Like That" is a song recorded by South Korean girl group Blackpink. It was released on June 26, 2020, through YG Entertainment and Interscope Records, as the lead single from the group's debut studio album, The Album (2020). The Japanese version of the single was released through Interscope Records and Universal Music Japan on July 27, 2021. An EDM, hip hop, trap, club and pop song, it was composed and produced by Teddy, R.Tee, and 24, while Teddy co-wrote the lyrics with Danny Chung.

"How You Like That" was a commercial success in South Korea and peaked at number one on the Gaon Digital Chart for three weeks, marking Blackpink's third number-one single in the country. It peaked at number 33 on the US Billboard Hot 100, becoming Blackpink's second top-40 hit and tying as the highest-charting song by a female K-pop act in the country. The song also topped the national charts in Hungary, Singapore, and Malaysia as well as Billboard's K-pop Hot 100 and World Digital Songs charts, and figured within the record charts in 26 other countries. The song was certified diamond in Brazil, double platinum in Canada, platinum in South Korea, Japan, Australia, and New Zealand, and silver in the United Kingdom, while the physical version was also certified platinum in South Korea for surpassing 250,000 units sold.

The music video for the song, directed by Seo Hyun-seung, set various records on YouTube upon its release. It garnered the highest number of views during a premiere, the most views for a music video within 24 hours—with 86.3 million views—and became the fastest video to reach 100 million and 200 million views on the platform. It also became one of the most-liked videos on YouTube with over 25 million likes. Both the song's music video and dance performance video achieved one billion views on YouTube, and it became the first song by a K-pop girl group to reach one billion streams on Spotify. "How You Like That" won numerous accolades, including Song of Summer at the 2020 MTV Video Music Awards and Best Dance Award for a female group at both the 2020 Melon Music Awards and Mnet Asian Music Awards.

== Background and release ==
On May 4, 2020, it was reported that the group had finished recording their new album and were working on a schedule to shoot a music video later that month. On May 18, YG Entertainment shared an update on the project, projected for a June 2020 release, and revealed that more than ten songs were expected for their first full-length album. On June 10, YG Entertainment released the teaser poster to the single on social media and confirmed the comeback date to be June 26. Three days later, YG Entertainment released a prologue of the group's newest reality show, 24/365 with Blackpink, ahead of its launch on July 4, via YouTube. The show documents their comeback alongside sharing their lives through vlogs. According to member Jisoo in the prologue of 24/365 with Blackpink, the song represented a move from previous "powerful" music, describing it as more "swag".

On June 15, YG Entertainment released individual posters of the members. The teaser video was released on June 21, while the official group teaser poster was revealed the following day. The music video teaser was released on June 24, and the song officially premiered on June 26, 2020, after an hour-long live countdown. A physical version of the single was released on July 17, 2020, featuring the song and its instrumental.

== Composition ==
"How You Like That"
An 18-second sample of "How You Like That", which is described as an EDM, hip hop, trap, club and pop song.

"How You Like That" was composed and produced by Teddy, R.Tee, and 24, while its lyrics were penned by Teddy and Danny Chung. Musically, "How You Like That" is an EDM, hip hop, trap, club and pop song about "not being daunted by dark situations and to not lose the confidence and strength to stand up again". A "thrillingly bombastic lead single", Billboard wrote, the track "fuses pop, trap and hip-hop with regal horn blasts and a braggadocious hook."

== Critical reception ==
"How You Like That" received generally positive reviews from music critics. Consequence of Sound ranked the song as the 27th best track of the year, noting that the members deliver a positive message of resilience over a "slamming, hip-hop-oriented track with plenty of explosive drops." The Los Angeles Times featured the song in their list of the top 50 songs of 2020, asserting that the "squelchy, gum-smacking and titanically fun comeback" should establish them as pop icons in the U.S. in the foreseeable future. Billboard magazine placed the song at number 23 on their list of the 100 Best Songs of 2020, praising its musical arrangement and the group's dynamic energy, and felt that the "fireworks show of a coda" was "the most thrilling 30 seconds of pop all year." Crystal Bell of Paper magazine initially criticized the song for its formulaic structure, but countered that by emphasizing its addictive quality and described the song as "gloriously big", feeling that it had significantly more cultural impact than the group's other singles released that year.

"How You Like That" on year-end lists
Critic/Publication	List	Rank	Ref.
Billboard	The 100 Best Songs of 2020	23	
Billboard	The 25 Best Music Videos of 2020	20	
Billboard	The 30 Best Pop Songs of 2020	—	
Consequence of Sound	Top 50 Songs of 2020	27	
Los Angeles Times	The 50 best songs of 2020	—	
Paper	The 40 Best K-pop Songs of 2020	19	
Pitchfork	The 100 Best Songs of 2020: Reader's Poll	98	

== Accolades ==
"How You Like That" received 13 first place awards on South Korean music programs, while its music video achieved five Guinness World Records. It additionally received three consecutive weekly Melon Popularity Awards in July 2020.

Awards and nominations for "How You Like That"
Year	Organization	Award	Result	Ref.
2020	APAN Music Awards	Best Music Video	Won	
2020	Asian Pop Music Awards	Best Arranger (Overseas) (Note: Arrangers: R.Tee and 24)	Won	
2020	Asian Pop Music Awards	Best Producer (Overseas) (Note: Producer: Teddy)	Nominated	
2020	Asian Pop Music Awards	Song of the Year (Overseas)	Nominated	
2020	BreakTudo Awards	International Music Video	Nominated	
2020	Joox Hong Kong Top Music Awards	Fan Favorite K-Pop	Won	
2020	Meus Prêmios Nick	Favorite International Hit	Nominated	
2020	MTV Video Music Awards	Song of Summer	Won	
2020	Melon Music Awards	Best Dance – Female	Won	
2020	Melon Music Awards	Song of the Year	Nominated	
2020	Mnet Asian Music Awards	Best Dance Performance Female Group	Won	
2020	Mnet Asian Music Awards	Song of the Year	Nominated	
2021	Gaon Chart Music Awards	Artist of the Year – Digital Music (June)	Won	
2021	Golden Disc Awards	Best Digital Song (Bonsang)	Won	
2021	Golden Disc Awards	Song of the Year (Daesang)	Nominated	
2021	iHeartRadio Music Awards	Best Music Video	Nominated	
2021	Seoul Music Awards	Main Award (Bonsang)	Nominated	

Key
†	Indicates a formerly held world record

World records for "How You Like That"
Year	Organization	Award	Ref.
2020	Guinness World Records	† Most viewed YouTube video in 24 hours	
2020	Guinness World Records	† Most viewed YouTube music video in 24 hours	
2020	Guinness World Records	† Most viewed YouTube music video in 24 hours by a K-pop group	
2020	Guinness World Records	† Most viewers for the premiere of a video on YouTube	
2020	Guinness World Records	† Most viewers for the premiere of a music video on YouTube	

Music program awards (13 total)
Program	Date	Ref.
Inkigayo	July 5, 2020	
Inkigayo	July 12, 2020	
Inkigayo	July 19, 2020	
Show Champion	July 8, 2020	
Show Champion	July 15, 2020	
Show Champion	July 29, 2020	
M Countdown	July 9, 2020	
M Countdown	July 16, 2020	
Music Bank	July 10, 2020	
Music Bank	July 31, 2020	
Show! Music Core	July 11, 2020	
Show! Music Core	July 18, 2020	
Show! Music Core	July 25, 2020	

== Commercial performance ==
In South Korea, the song debuted at number 12 on the Gaon Digital Chart issue dated June 21–27 with less than two days of tracking. The following week (June 28 – July 4) it rose to number one, making it Blackpink's third single to do so, after "Whistle" (2016) and "Ddu-Du Ddu-Du" (2018). It remained atop the chart for three weeks and became the first song by the group since "Ddu-Du Ddu-Du" to top the Gaon Monthly chart. The physical version of the single debuted at number two on the Gaon Album Chart, and peaked at number one the following week. It sold 302,377 copies in 2020 and was certified Platinum by the Korea Music Content Association. The song entered the Billboard K-pop Hot 100 chart issue dated June 27 at number 50, and reached number one the following week on the issue dated July 4. In Japan, the single debuted at number 24 on the Oricon Combined Singles Chart with 8,219 downloads sold and 1,804,749 streams in its first three days. It debuted at number 17 on the Billboard Japan Hot 100 with 3,952 estimated units, and peaked at number eight the following week with 6,321 estimated units. The song peaked at number one in Malaysia and Singapore for eight weeks each, and was the highest-selling song of 2020 in Malaysia.

In the United States, "How You Like That" debuted at number 33 on the Billboard Hot 100, tying with "Sour Candy" as the highest-charting song by a female Korean act at that time. It debuted at number two on the Digital Song Sales chart with 16,400 copies sold and at number 18 on the Streaming Songs chart. The song also reached the top twenty in Australia, Canada, Estonia, Hungary, New Zealand, the United Kingdom and Scotland. The track reached 38.9 million streams in the UK as of September 2022, becoming the group's third most streamed song in the country. Globally, "How You Like That" debuted at number five and peaked at number two on the daily Spotify Global Chart, breaking the record for the biggest girl group debut in Spotify history. Following the chart's launch in September, "How You Like That" charted on the Billboard Global 200 for 34 weeks, becoming the third longest-charting song by a K-pop act as well as the longest-charting song among all female K-pop acts. In 2021, the song became the first by a female Korean group to surpass 500 million streams on Spotify. In 2024, "How You Like That" reached one billion streams on Spotify, marking the first-ever K-pop girl group to reach the milestone and only the second K-pop female act after member Lisa's song "Money" did so in 2023.

== Music video ==
=== Background and synopsis ===
A scene in the music video, where Blackpink is surrounded by dancers and statues of horses in a grand domed hall

The music video for "How You Like That" was directed by Seo Hyun-seung, who had previously directed "Ddu-Du Ddu-Du" and "Kill This Love". Released at 10:00 BST on Friday, June 26, 2020, it was the most streamed music video premiere on YouTube at the time with 1.66 million concurrent viewers, and the most viewed music video in its first 24 hours at the time with 86.3 million views. It became the fastest video in the platform's history to hit 100 million views, doing so in 32 hours, and 200 million views, doing so in seven days. On November 12, 2021, the music video accumulated one billion views, becoming Blackpink's fifth music video and the fastest music video by a Korean female act to do so.

In the beginning scene of the music video, all four sit like queens atop steps. The members are depicted dancing in several locations, including a jungle, a trapezoidal hall, and the Arctic, all while rocking a parade of high-fashion looks. At the end, they are united in a dance break in a grand domed hall where the quartet are surrounded by back-up dancers. The colorful music video shows Jennie, Lisa, Rosé and Jisoo deliver both a message of resilience and a blistering kiss-off to an unseen foe.

Controversy sparked on social media after the official music video's release due to the inclusion of a statue of the Hindu god Ganesha in a solo scene with band member Lisa. The statue was used as a prop and placed on the floor next to a bejewelled Aladdin lamp, causing an outcry from fans who labelled the placement as "inappropriate" and "disrespectful", and the statue's usage as "cultural appropriation". The statue was subsequently edited out of the video.

=== Dance performance video ===
A dance performance video was additionally released on July 6, 2020; the video features the four members doing the full choreography in matching black athleisure in front of a hot pink background. In the climax, the girls are joined by eight back-up dancers for a high-energy, synchronized finale. In January 2021, it became the first K-pop dance performance video to reach 500 million views on YouTube. On February 7, 2022, it became the first K-pop dance performance video and Blackpink's sixth video to achieve one billion views. It also marked the first time that both the music video and the dance performance video for the same song reached one billion views each. The video was named the 20th best music video of 2020 by Billboard and was praised as being "endlessly watchable".

== Covers and other usage ==
In October 2020, the song was performed by Everglow during the second season of KCON:TACT’s live online concert. In December 2022, Nmixx performed a cover of the song at the 2022 SBS Gayo Daejeon. The song made an appearance in the 10th episode of the first season of the Disney+ series Big Shot titled Marvyn's Playbook, which was broadcast on June 18, 2021. It was also used in the initial trailer of Hotel Transylvania: Transformania during an interview with directors Derek Drymon and Jennifer Kluska. In 2023, "How You Like That" was featured in a commercial for the Google Pixel 8 smartphone and was added to the main tracklist of the video game Just Dance 2024 Edition.

== Track listing ==
Digital download and streaming

- 1. "How You Like That" – 3:01

CD single

- 1. "How You Like That" – 3:01
- 2. "How You Like That" (instrumental) – 3:01

== Credits and personnel ==
Credits adapted from the liner notes of the CD single and The Album – JP Ver.

Recording

- Recorded at The Black Label Studio (Seoul)
- Mixed at The Lab (Los Angeles)
- Mastered at Sterling Sound (New York City)

Personnel

- Blackpink – vocals
- Teddy – lyricist, composer, producer
- Danny Chung – lyricist
- Co-sho – lyricist (Japanese version)
- R.Tee – composer, arranger, producer
- 24 – composer, arranger, producer
- Yong In Choi – recording engineer
- Jason Robert – mixing engineer
- Randy Merrill – mastering engineer

== Charts ==
=== Weekly charts ===
Weekly chart performance for "How You Like That"
Chart (2020–2023)	Peak position
Argentina Hot 100 (Billboard)	47
Australia (ARIA)	12
Austria (Ö3 Austria Top 40)	55
Canada Hot 100 (Billboard)	11
Czech Republic Singles Digital (ČNS IFPI)	45
Estonia (Eesti Tipp-40)	15
Euro Digital Songs (Billboard)	9
France (SNEP)	78
Germany (GfK)	66
Global 200 (Billboard)	24
Greece International (IFPI)	17
Guatemala Anglo (Monitor Latino)	18
Hong Kong (HKRIA)	7
Hungary (Single Top 40)	1
Hungary (Stream Top 40)	12
Ireland (IRMA)	26
Japan (Japan Hot 100)	8
Japan Combined Singles (Oricon)	8
Lithuania (AGATA)	21
Malaysia (RIM)	1
Netherlands (Single Top 100)	77
Netherlands (Tipparade)	8
Netherlands (Global Top 40)	2
New Zealand (Recorded Music NZ)	14
Portugal (AFP)	25
Scottish Singles Sales (Official Charts)	13
Singapore (RIAS)	1
Slovakia Singles Digital (ČNS IFPI)	30
South Korea (Gaon)	1
South Korea (K-pop Hot 100)	1
South Korean Albums (Gaon)	1
Spain (PROMUSICAE)	78
Sweden (Sverigetopplistan)	92
Switzerland (Schweizer Hitparade)	50
Taiwan (Billboard)	8
UK Singles (Official Charts)	20
US Billboard Hot 100	33
US World Digital Song Sales (Billboard)	1
Venezuela Anglo (Record Report)	4
Venezuela Pop (Record Report)	21
Vietnam (Vietnam Hot 100)	25

=== Monthly charts ===
Monthly chart performance for "How You Like That"
Chart (2020)	Position
Brazil (Top 50 Streaming)	26
South Korea (Gaon)	1
South Korean Albums (Gaon)	2

=== Year-end charts ===
2020 year-end chart performance for "How You Like That"
Chart (2020)	Position
Hungary (Single Top 40)	27
Japan (Japan Hot 100)	72
Malaysia (RIM)	1
South Korea (Gaon)	16
South Korean Albums (Gaon)	32

2021 year-end chart performance for "How You Like That"
Chart (2021)	Position
Global 200 (Billboard)	185
Hungary (Single Top 40)	79
South Korea (Gaon)	69

2022 year-end chart performance for "How You Like That"
Chart (2022)	Position
Hungary (Single Top 40)	96

== Certifications and sales ==
Certifications and sales for "How You Like That"
Region	Certification	Certified units/sales
Australia (ARIA)	Platinum	70,000^{‡}
Brazil (Pro-Música Brasil)	Diamond	160,000^{‡}
Canada (Music Canada)	2× Platinum	160,000^{‡}
France (SNEP)	Platinum	200,000^{‡}
Italy (FIMI)	Gold	50,000^{‡}
New Zealand (RMNZ)	Platinum	30,000^{‡}
Poland (ZPAV)	Gold	25,000^{‡}
Portugal (AFP)	Gold	5,000^{‡}
South Korea (KMCA) Physical album	Platinum	357,522
Spain (Promusicae)	Gold	30,000^{‡}
United Kingdom (BPI)	Gold	400,000^{‡}
Streaming
Japan (RIAJ)	Platinum	100,000,000^{†}
South Korea (KMCA)	Platinum	100,000,000^{†}
^{‡} Sales+streaming figures based on certification alone.^{†} Streaming-only figures based on certification alone.

== Release history ==
Release dates and formats for "How You Like That"
Region	Date	Version	Format	Label	Ref.
Various	June 26, 2020	Korean	Digital download; streaming	YG; Interscope	
Italy	July 3, 2020	Korean	Contemporary hit radio	Universal	
South Korea	July 17, 2020	Korean; instrumental	CD single	YG; YG Plus	
Various	July 27, 2021	Japanese	Digital download; streaming	Interscope; Universal Japan	

== See also ==
- List of best-selling girl group singles
- List of certified albums in South Korea
- List of certified songs in South Korea
- List of Gaon Album Chart number ones of 2020
- List of Gaon Digital Chart number ones of 2020
- List of Inkigayo Chart winners (2020)
- List of K-pop Hot 100 number ones
- List of most-liked YouTube videos
- List of M Countdown Chart winners (2020)
- List of Music Bank Chart winners (2020)
- List of number-one songs of 2020 (Malaysia)
- List of number-one songs of 2020 (Singapore)
- List of Show! Music Core Chart winners (2020)
- List of Show Champion Chart winners (2020)
- List of viral music videos
