= People's Choice Award for Favorite Concert Tour =

Pop culture award

People's Choice Awards for Favorite Concert Tour
- Country: United States
- First award: 2018
- Final award: 2024
- Currently held by: Taylor Swift – The Eras Tour

Highlights
- Most awards: Taylor Swift (2)

The People's Choice Awards for Favorite Concert Tour is one of the awards handed out at the People's Choice Awards. It was first awarded to Taylor Swift for the Reputation Stadium Tour in 2018. Swift is the most-awarded artist in the category, with two wins.

== Recipients ==
Year	Recipient	Nominees	Ref.
2018	Taylor Swift – Reputation Stadium Tour	Beyoncé & Jay-Z – On the Run II Tour; Britney Spears – Piece of Me Tour; Super Junior – Super Show 7; Katy Perry – Witness: The Tour	
2019	Blackpink – In Your Area World Tour	Pink – Beautiful Trauma World Tour; Jennifer Lopez – It's My Party; Cher – Here We Go Again Tour; BTS – Love Yourself World Tour; Lady Gaga – Lady Gaga Enigma + Jazz & Piano; Justin Timberlake – The Man of the Woods Tour; Ariana Grande – Sweetener World Tour	
No award given between 2020 and 2021 due to the COVID-19 pandemic.
2022	BTS – Permission to Dance on Stage	Bad Bunny – World's Hottest Tour; Luke Combs – The Middle of Somewhere Tour; Billie Eilish – Happier Than Ever, The World Tour; Lady Gaga – The Chromatica Ball; Dua Lipa – Future Nostalgia Tour; Ed Sheeran – +–=÷× Tour; Harry Styles – Love On Tour	
2024	Taylor Swift – The Eras Tour	Beyoncé – Renaissance World Tour; Coldplay – Music of the Spheres World Tour; Ed Sheeran – +–=÷x Tour; Harry Styles – Love On Tour; Luke Combs – Luke Combs World Tour; Morgan Wallen – One Night at a Time World Tour; Pink – Summer Carnival	

== Artists with multiple nominations ==
2 nominations

- Taylor Swift
- Beyoncé
- Pink
- BTS
- Lady Gaga
- Luke Combs
- Ed Sheeran
- Harry Styles
