= 44th People's Choice Awards =

Pop culture award show held in 2018

2018 E! People's Choice Awards
- Date: November 11, 2018
- Location: Barker Hangar; Santa Monica, California

Highlights
- Most wins: Film: Avengers: Infinity War (3); TV: Shadowhunters (4); Music: BTS (4)
- Most nominations: Film: Avengers: Infinity War (6); TV: Grey's Anatomy & Shadowhunters (5); Music: BTS & Ariana Grande (4)
- Website: pca.eonline.com

Television/radio coverage
- Network: E! Simulcast partners: Bravo; Syfy; USA Network; Universo (Note: The ceremony was carried by Universo in a simulcast with the original audio, though with Spanish closed captioning as E! usually does not carry a separate Spanish captioning channel.)

The 2018 People's Choice Awards, officially the 2018 E! People's Choice Awards, were held on November 11, 2018, to honor the best in pop culture for 2018.

This ceremony, the 44th edition of the People's Choice Awards, marked a change of network from CBS to E!, after E!'s acquisition of the awards from Procter & Gamble, and the ceremony's move from January to November.

== Performers ==
- Nicki Minaj & Tyga – "Hard White (Intro/Reprise)", "Good Form" & "Dip"
- Rita Ora – "Let You Love Me"
- John Legend – "Pride (In the Name of Love)"

== Winners and nominees ==
The first round of nominees was announced on September 5, 2018, with the finalists named on September 24. Winners are listed first and in boldface.

=== Film ===
The Movie of 2018	The Comedy Movie of 2018
**Avengers: Infinity War**; Black Panther; Fifty Shades Freed; Incredibles 2; A Quiet Place	**The Spy Who Dumped Me**; Blockers; Crazy Rich Asians; Love, Simon; Mamma Mia! Here We Go Again
The Action Movie of 2018	The Drama Movie of 2018
**Avengers: Infinity War**; Black Panther; Deadpool 2; Jurassic World: Fallen Kingdom; Ocean's 8	**Fifty Shades Freed**; 12 Strong; Midnight Sun; A Quiet Place; Red Sparrow
The Family Movie of 2018	The Drama Movie Star of 2018
**Incredibles 2**; Christopher Robin; Hotel Transylvania 3: Summer Vacation; I Can Only Imagine; A Wrinkle in Time	**Jamie Dornan – Fifty Shades Freed**; Emily Blunt – A Quiet Place; Chris Hemsworth – 12 Strong; John Krasinski – A Quiet Place; Jennifer Lawrence – Red Sparrow
The Male Movie Star of 2018	The Female Movie Star of 2018
**Chadwick Boseman – Black Panther**; Robert Downey Jr. – Avengers: Infinity War; Chris Hemsworth – Avengers: Infinity War; Chris Pratt – Jurassic World: Fallen Kingdom; Nick Robinson – Love, Simon	**Scarlett Johansson – Avengers: Infinity War**; Sandra Bullock – Ocean's 8; Anne Hathaway – Ocean's 8; Bryce Dallas Howard – Jurassic World: Fallen Kingdom; Lily James – Mamma Mia! Here We Go Again
The Comedy Movie Star of 2018	The Action Movie Star of 2018
**Melissa McCarthy – Life of the Party**; John Cena – Blockers; Mila Kunis – The Spy Who Dumped Me; Nick Robinson – Love, Simon; Amanda Seyfried – Mamma Mia! Here We Go Again	**Danai Gurira – Black Panther**; Chadwick Boseman – Black Panther; Chris Hemsworth – Avengers: Infinity War; Chris Pratt – Jurassic World: Fallen Kingdom; Ryan Reynolds – Deadpool 2

=== TV ===
The Show of 2018	The Drama Show of 2018
**Shadowhunters**; 13 Reasons Why; The Big Bang Theory; Grey's Anatomy; This Is Us	**Riverdale**; 13 Reasons Why; Grey's Anatomy; The Handmaid's Tale; This Is Us
The Comedy Show of 2018	The Revival Show of 2018
**Orange Is the New Black**; The Big Bang Theory; Black-ish; The Good Place; Modern Family	**Dynasty**; American Idol; Jersey Shore: Family Vacation; One Day at a Time; Queer Eye
The Reality Show of 2018	The Competition Show of 2018
**Keeping Up with the Kardashians**; Chrisley Knows Best; Jersey Shore: Family Vacation; Queer Eye; Vanderpump Rules	**The Voice**; America's Got Talent; Big Brother; Ellen's Game of Games; RuPaul's Drag Race
The Male TV Star of 2018	The Female TV Star of 2018
**Harry Shum Jr. — Shadowhunters**; Justin Chambers – Grey's Anatomy; Freddie Highmore – The Good Doctor; Andrew Lincoln – The Walking Dead; Cole Sprouse – Riverdale	**Katherine McNamara — Shadowhunters**; Viola Davis – How to Get Away with Murder; Camila Mendes – Riverdale; Mandy Moore – This Is Us; Ellen Pompeo – Grey's Anatomy
The Drama TV Star of 2018	The Comedy TV Star of 2018
**Mariska Hargitay – Law & Order: Special Victims Unit**; KJ Apa – Riverdale; Darren Criss – The Assassination of Gianni Versace: American Crime Story; Katherine Langford – 13 Reasons Why; Ellen Pompeo – Grey's Anatomy	**Jim Parsons – The Big Bang Theory**; Drew Barrymore – Santa Clarita Diet; Kristen Bell – The Good Place; Donald Glover – Atlanta; Sofia Vergara – Modern Family
The Daytime Talk Show of 2018	The Nighttime Talk Show of 2018
**The Ellen DeGeneres Show**; Live with Kelly and Ryan; The Real; Red Table Talk; Steve	**The Tonight Show Starring Jimmy Fallon**; The Daily Show with Trevor Noah; Jimmy Kimmel Live!; The Late Late Show with James Corden; Watch What Happens Live with Andy Cohen
The Competition Contestant of 2018	The Reality TV Star of 2018
**Maddie Poppe – American Idol**; Nikki Bella – Dancing with the Stars; Brynn Cartelli – The Voice; Eva Igo – World of Dance; Cody Nickson – The Amazing Race	**Khloé Kardashian – Keeping Up with the Kardashians**; Nikki Bella – Total Bellas; Paul "Pauly D" DelVecchio – Jersey Shore: Family Vacation; Joanna Gaines – Fixer Upper; Antoni Porowski – Queer Eye
The Bingeworthy Show of 2018	The Sci-Fi/Fantasy Show of 2018
**Shadowhunters**; 13 Reasons Why; Outlander; Queer Eye; Shameless	**Wynonna Earp**; The Expanse; The Originals; Shadowhunters; Supernatural

=== Music ===
The Male Artist of 2018	The Female Artist of 2018
**Shawn Mendes**; Drake; Bruno Mars; Ed Sheeran; Keith Urban	**Nicki Minaj**; Cardi B; Camila Cabello; Ariana Grande; Taylor Swift
The Group of 2018	The Song of 2018
**BTS**; 5 Seconds of Summer; Panic! at the Disco; Super Junior; Twenty One Pilots	**"Idol" — BTS**; "Back to You" – Selena Gomez; "I Like It" – Cardi B, Bad Bunny, & J Balvin; "In My Blood" – Shawn Mendes; "No Tears Left to Cry" – Ariana Grande
The Album of 2018	The Country Artist of 2018
**Queen – Nicki Minaj**; Camila – Camila Cabello; Invasion of Privacy – Cardi B; Shawn Mendes – Shawn Mendes; Sweetener – Ariana Grande	**Blake Shelton**; Luke Bryan; Thomas Rhett; Carrie Underwood; Keith Urban
The Latin Artist of 2018	The Music Video of 2018
**CNCO**; J Balvin; Bad Bunny; Becky G; Shakira	**"Idol" — BTS**; "Back to You" – Selena Gomez; "Never Be the Same" – Camila Cabello; "No Tears Left to Cry" – Ariana Grande; "This Is America" – Childish Gambino
The Concert Tour of 2018
**Reputation Stadium Tour – Taylor Swift**; On the Run II Tour – Beyoncé & Jay-Z; Piece of Me Tour – Britney Spears; Super Show 7 – Super Junior; Witness: The Tour – Katy Perry

=== Pop culture ===
The Social Star of 2018	The Beauty Influencer of 2018
**Shane Dawson**; Amanda Cerny; The Dolan Twins; Jenna Marbles; Lele Pons	**James Charles**; Jackie Aina; Brooklyn and Bailey McKnight; NikkieTutorials; Bretman Rock
The Social Celebrity of 2018	The Animal Star of 2018
**BTS**; Ellen DeGeneres; Selena Gomez; Taylor Swift; Chrissy Teigen	**Crusoe the Celebrity Dachshund**; April the giraffe; Cole & Marmalade; Gone to the Snow Dogs; Lil Bub
The Comedy Act of 2018	The Style Star of 2018
**Kevin Hart**; Tiffany Haddish; Amy Schumer; Marlon Wayans; Ali Wong	**Harry Styles**; Beyoncé; Blake Lively; Emma Watson; Zendaya
The Game Changer of 2018	The Pop Podcast of 2018
**Serena Williams**; Nia Jax; Colin Kaepernick; Aly Raisman; Cristiano Ronaldo	**Scrubbing In with Becca Tilley & Tanya Rad**; Amy Schumer Presents: 3 Girls, 1 Keith; Anna Faris is Unqualified; Chicks in the Office; LadyGang
The Most Hype Worthy Canadian of 2018	L'Influenceur Pop Culture Français de 2018
**Tessa Virtue & Scott Moir**; Drake; Shawn Mendes; Sandra Oh; Ryan Reynolds	**Lufy**; Beauty Active; Pembe Cherole; Stephanie Durant; Horia

=== Other ===
People's Fashion Icon Award

- Victoria Beckham

People's Icon of 2018

- Melissa McCarthy

People's Champion Award

- Bryan Stevenson
