= Teddy Park production discography =

This is the production discography of American rapper, songwriter, and record producer Teddy Park. Park was previously a member of the hip hop group 1TYM. He has produced under YG Entertainment, and since 2016 has been producing under his own record label and entertainment company The Black Label.

Park has received several accolades including a Grammy Award and a Golden Globe Award, in addition to a nomination for an Academy Award. Forbes magazine describes him as the "K-pop/rap star turned prolific music producer who has helped shape and aid South Korean music's global crossover".

Credits are adapted from the Korea Music Copyright Association and indicate where Park has writing or co-writing credits for lyrics, music, or song arrangement.

== 1998-2009 ==
Year	Artist	Song	Album
1998	1TYM	"What Is This World For" (뭘 위한 세상인가)	One Time For Your Mind
1999	1TYM	"1TYM Attack"	Famillenium
2000	1TYM	"Let's Sing and Dance Together" (쾌지나 칭칭)	2nd Round
2000	1TYM	"One Love"	2nd Round
2000	1TYM	"Headed That Way" (향해가)	2nd Round
2001	1TYM	"Nasty"	Third Time To Yo' Mind
2001	1TYM	"Hello"	Third Time To Yo' Mind
2001	1TYM	"Wow" (우와)	Third Time To Yo' Mind
2001	1TYM	"Make it Last"	Third Time To Yo' Mind
2001	1TYM	"Hip Hop Kids"	Third Time To Yo' Mind
2001	1TYM	"Mother" (어머니)	Third Time To Yo' Mind
2001	1TYM	"Bus" (버스)	Third Time To Yo' Mind
2001	1TYM	"Sucky Busty"	Third Time To Yo' Mind
2001	Jinusean	"A-Yo!"	The Reign
2001	Jinusean	"Hiphop Seoul" (feat. Chino XL, Masta Wu, Teddy Park)	The Reign
2002	YG Family	"Hip Hop Gentlemen" (멋쟁이 신사)	Why Be Normal
2003	1TYM	"Freeflo (Intro)"	Once N 4 All
2003	1TYM	"Uh-Oh!"	Once N 4 All
2003	1TYM	"Set It Off" (떠나자)	Once N 4 All
2003	1TYM	"Hot" (Hot 뜨거)	Once N 4 All
2003	1TYM	"Without You"	Once N 4 All
2003	1TYM	"Cry" (울고싶어라)	Once N 4 All
2003	1TYM	"Everyday and Night"	Once N 4 All
2003	1TYM	"It's Over"	Once N 4 All
2003	1TYM	"Teddy's Interlude"	Once N 4 All
2003	1TYM	"Put'em Up"	Once N 4 All
2003	1TYM	"Ok" (feat. Perry, Lexy)	Once N 4 All
2003	Masta Wu	"Run"	Masta Peace
2004	Seven	"Passion" (열정)	Must Listen
2004	Seven	"2 Nite"	Must Listen
2004	Jinusean	"Phone Number" (전화번호)	Let's Play
2004	Jinusean	"Microphone" (feat. Teddy Park, Taebin)	Let's Play
2004	Jinusean	"Passion (YG Remix)" (feat. Seven)	Let's Play
2004	Taebin	"Tabu" (feat. Teddy Park)	Taebin of 1TYM
2005	1TYM	"One Way (Intro)"	One Way
2005	1TYM	"Do You Know Me?" (니가 날 알어?)	One Way
2005	1TYM	"What You Gunna Do?" (어쩔겁니까)	One Way
2005	1TYM	"How Many Times?" (몇 번이나)	One Way
2005	1TYM	"The Instruction (Interlude)"	One Way
2005	1TYM	"Danger" (위험해)	One Way
2005	1TYM	"Can't Let U Go"	One Way
2005	1TYM	"How It Go"	One Way
2005	1TYM	"Happy To Da Hoppa (Outro)"	One Way
2006	Seven	"I Know" (난 알아요)	27/Se7en
2006	Seven	"Oh No!"	27/Se7en
2006	Seven	"The One"	27/Se7en
2006	Seven	"Girlfriend"	Se7olution
2006	Seven	"La La La" (라 라 라)	Se7olution
2006	Seven	"Again"	Se7olution
2006	Seven	"Can You Feel Me"	Se7olution
2006	BigBang	"We Belong Together" (feat. Park Bom)	Big Bang
2006	Stony Skunk	No More Trouble"	Stony Riddum
2007	BigBang	"Always"	Always
2007	Masta Wu	"Don't Stop" (feat. Jinu)	Mass Wu Pt. 2
2007	Masta Wu	"Do or Die" (feat. Teddy Park)	Mass Wu Pt. 2
2007	Masta Wu	"Bubblegum" (껌) (feat. Teddy Park)	Mass Wu Pt. 2
2007	Stony Skunk	"Fired Up"	More Fyah
2007	Stony Skunk	"I'm Happy" (행복해요)	More Fyah
2008	BigBang	"Intro (Stand Up)"	Stand Up
2008	BigBang	"Lady"	Stand Up
2008	BigBang	"With U"	Number 1
2008	BigBang	"Sunset Glow" (붉은 노을)	Remember
2008	BigBang	"Wonderful"	Remember
2008	BigBang	"Remember"	Remember
2008	Taeyang	"Prayer" (기도) (feat. Teddy Park)	Hot
2008	Taeyang	"Only Look At Me" (나만 바라봐)	Hot
2008	Uhm Jung-hwa	"DJ" (feat. CL)	D.I.S.C.O
2008	Uhm Jung-hwa	"D.I.S.C.O" (feat. T.O.P)	D.I.S.C.O
2008	Uhm Jung-hwa	"D.I.S.C.O Pt. 2" (feat. G-Dragon)	D.I.S.C.O
2008	YMGA	"Get Up"	Made In R.O.K
2008	YMGA	"Scandal" (feat. Taebin)	Made In R.O.K
2008	YMGA	"What" (feat. YG Family, DJ Wreck)	Made In R.O.K
2008	H-Eugene	"Shorty" (feat. Teddy Park, Masta Wu, Park Jang-geun)	H-Eugene and the Family
2008	Gummy	"I'm Sorry" (미안해요) (feat. T.O.P)	Comfort
2009	G-Dragon	"Gossip Man" (feat. Kim Gun-mo)	Heartbreaker
2009	G-Dragon	"The Leaders" (feat. CL, Teddy Park)	Heartbreaker
2009	BigBang	"Koe o Kikasete"	Big Bang 2
2009	Taeyang	"Where U At"	Solar
2009	Taeyang	"Wedding Dress"	Solar
2009	T.O.P and Taeyang	"Friend" (친구)	Friend, Our Legend OST
2009	G-Dragon, T.O.P and Taeyang	"Hallelujah" (할렐루야)	Iris OST
2009	2NE1	"Fire"	2NE1 (2009)
2009	2NE1	"I Don't Care"	2NE1 (2009)
2009	2NE1	"In the Club"	2NE1 (2009)
2009	2NE1	"Let's Go Party"	2NE1 (2009)
2009	2NE1	"Pretty Boy"	2NE1 (2009)
2009	2NE1	"Lollipop" (with Big Bang)	2NE1 (2009)
2009	2NE1	"Kiss" (Sandara Park solo, feat. CL)	To Anyone
2009	2NE1	"Please Don't Go" (CL and Minzy duet)	To Anyone
2009	2NE1	"You And I" (Park Bom solo)	To Anyone

== 2010-2019 ==
Year	Artist	Song	Album
2010	2NE1	"Can't Nobody"	To Anyone
2010	2NE1	"Go Away"	To Anyone
2010	2NE1	"Try to Follow Me"	To Anyone
2010	2NE1	"Can't Nobody" (English version)	To Anyone
2010	Gummy	"남자라서 (Because You Are A Man)"	Loveless
2010	BigBang	"The Shouts of Reds Part. 2" (with Yuna Kim)	Non album singles
2010	BigBang	"Lollipop Pt. 2"	Non album singles
2010	Taeyang	"Superstar"	Solar
2010	Taeyang	"Just a Feeling"	Solar
2010	Taeyang	"Move" (feat. Teddy Park)	Solar
2010	Taeyang	"Break Down"	Solar
2010	Taeyang	"Where U At"	Solar
2010	Seven	"Better Together"	Digital Bounce
2010	Seven	"I'm Going Crazy"	Digital Bounce
2010	Seven	"Money Can't Buy Me Love"	Digital Bounce
2010	GD & T.O.P	"High High"	GD & TOP
2010	GD & T.O.P	"Oh Yeah" (feat. Bom)	GD & TOP
2010	GD & T.O.P	"집에 가지마 (Don't Go Home)"	GD & TOP
2010	GD & T.O.P	"Turn It Up"	GD & TOP
2011	BigBang	"Love Song"	Tonight (Special edition)
2011	2NE1	"I Am the Best"	2NE1 2nd Mini Album
2011	2NE1	"Ugly"	2NE1 2nd Mini Album
2011	2NE1	"Lonely"	2NE1 2nd Mini Album
2011	2NE1	"Hate You"	2NE1 2nd Mini Album
2011	2NE1	"Don't Cry"	2NE1 2nd Mini Album
2011	2NE1	"Don't Stop the Music"	2NE1 2nd Mini Album
2012	BigBang	"Intro (Alive)"	Alive
2012	BigBang	"Blue"	Alive
2012	BigBang	"사랑먼지 (Love Dust)"	Alive
2012	BigBang	"Fantastic Baby"	Alive
2012	BigBang	"빙글빙글 (Round and Round)"	Still Alive (Special Edition)
2012	2NE1	"Scream" (Japanese version)	Collection
2012	2NE1	"I Love You"	Non-album single
2012	G-Dragon	"Crayon"	One Of A Kind
2012	G-Dragon	"That XX"	One Of A Kind
2012	G-Dragon	"Missing You" (feat. Kim Yoon-ah)	One Of A Kind
2013	Lee Hi	"Rose"	First Love
2013	CL	"나쁜 기집애 (The Baddest Female)"	
2013	2NE1	"Falling In Love"	Non-album singles
2013	2NE1	"Do You Love Me"	Non-album singles
2013	2NE1	"Missing You"	Non-album singles
2013	G-Dragon	"Niliria" (feat. Missy Elliott)	Coup d'Etat
2013	G-Dragon	"R.O.D." (feat. Lydia Paek)	Coup d'Etat
2013	G-Dragon	"Black" (feat. Jennie)	Coup d'Etat
2013	G-Dragon	"Crooked"	Coup d'Etat
2013	G-Dragon	"늴리리야 (Niliria)" (G-Dragon version)	Coup d'Etat
2013	G-Dragon	"Window"	Coup d'Etat
2013	G-Dragon	"Black" (feat. Sky Ferreira)	Coup d'Etat
2013	Kang Seung Yoon	"Wild and Young"	Non-album single
2013	Winner (Team A)	"Just Another Boy"	WIN (Who Is Next)
2013	iKon (Team B)	"Just Another Boy"	WIN (Who Is Next)
2014	2NE1	"Come Back Home"	Crush
2014	2NE1	"Gotta Be You"	Crush
2014	2NE1	"Good To You"	Crush
2014	2NE1	"멘붕 (MTBD)"	Crush
2014	2NE1	"Happy"	Crush
2014	2NE1	"Scream" (Korean version)	Crush
2014	2NE1	"Come Back Home" (Acoustic)	Crush
2014	Taeyang	"Eyes, Nose, Lips"	RISE
2014	Taeyang	"새벽 한시 (1AM)"	RISE
2014	Taeyang	"아름다워 (Body)"	RISE
2014	Winner	"걔 세 (I'm Him)"	2014 S/S
2014	Masta Wu	"Come Here" (feat. Dok2, Bobby)	Non-album single
2015	BigBang	"Loser"	M
2015	BigBang	"Bae Bae"	M
2015	BigBang	"Bang Bang Bang"	A
2015	BigBang	"We Like 2 Party"	A
2015	BigBang	"Sober"	D
2015	BigBang	"Zutter"	E
2015	BigBang	"Let's Not Fall in Love"	E
2015	iKON	"이리오너라 (Anthem)"	Welcome Back
2015	iKON	"지못미 (Apology)"	Welcome Back
2015	CL	"Hello Bitches"	N/A
2015	Psy	"Daddy" (feat. CL)	Chiljip Psy-da
2016	Lee Hi	"My Star"	Seoulite
2016	CL	"LIFTED"	N/A
2016	Blackpink	"Whistle" (휘파람)	Square One
2016	Blackpink	"Boombayah" (붐바야)	Square One
2016	Blackpink	"Playing with Fire" (불장난)	Square Two
2016	Blackpink	"Stay"	Square Two
2016	BigBang	"Fxxk It"	Made
2016	BigBang	"Girlfriend"	Made
2016	MOBB	"붐벼 (Full House)"	The MOBB
2016	MOBB	"빨리 전화해 (Hit Me)" (feat. Kush)	The MOBB
2017	G-Dragon	"Act I: 개소리 (Bullshit)"	Kwon Ji Yong
2017	G-Dragon	"Act II: Super Star"	Kwon Ji Yong
2017	Blackpink	"As If It's Your Last" (마지막처럼)	Non-album single
2017	Taeyang	"白夜 (White Night)"	White Night
2017	Taeyang	"Darling"	White Night
2017	Taeyang	"Ride"	White Night
2017	Taeyang	"Amazin'"	White Night
2017	Mix Nine	"Just Dance" (Boy version)	Part 1
2017	Mix Nine	"Just Dance" (Girl version)	Part 3
2017	Sunmi	"Gashina"	Non-album singles
2018	Sunmi	"Heroine"	Non-album singles
2018	iKON	"Beautiful"	Return
2018	Seungri	"1, 2, 3!"	The Great Seungri
2018	Blackpink	"Ddu-Du Ddu-Du" (뚜두뚜두)	Square Up
2018	Blackpink	"Forever Young"	Square Up
2018	Blackpink	"Really"	Square Up
2018	Blackpink	"See U Later"	Square Up
2018	Jennie	"Solo"	Non-album single
2019	Blackpink	"Kill This Love"	Kill This Love
2019	Blackpink	"Don't Know What To Do"	Kill This Love
2019	Blackpink	"Kick It"	Kill This Love
2019	Blackpink	"Hope Not" (아니길)	Kill This Love
2019	Jeon Somi	"Birthday"	XOXO

== 2020-present ==
Year	Artist	Song	Album
2020	Blackpink	"How You Like That"	The Album
2020	Blackpink	"Ice Cream" (with Selena Gomez)	The Album
2020	Blackpink	"Pretty Savage"	The Album
2020	Blackpink	"Lovesick Girls"	The Album
2020	Blackpink	"Crazy Over You"	The Album
2020	Jeon Somi	"What You Waiting For"	XOXO
2021	Jeon Somi	"Dumb Dumb"	XOXO
2021	Jeon Somi	"XOXO"	XOXO
2021	Jeon Somi	"Don't Let Me Go" (with Giriboy)	XOXO
2021	Rosé	"On the Ground"	R
2021	Rosé	"Gone"	R
2021	Lisa	"Lalisa"	Lalisa
2021	DJ Snake, Ozuna, Megan Thee Stallion and Lisa	"SG"	Non-album single
2022	Blackpink	"Ready for Love"	Born Pink
2022	Blackpink	"Pink Venom"	Born Pink
2022	Blackpink	"Shut Down"	Born Pink
2022	Blackpink	"Hard to Love"	Born Pink
2023	Taeyang	"Vibe" (feat. Jimin)	Down to Earth
2023	Jisoo	"Flower" (꽃)	Me
2023	Jisoo	"All Eyes on Me"	Me
2023	Jeon Somi	"Fast Forward"	Game Plan
2023	Jeon Somi	"Gold Gold Gold" (금금금)	Game Plan
2023	Jeon Somi	"Fxxked Up" (개별로)	Game Plan
2023	Jeon Somi	"The Way"	Game Plan
2023	Jennie	"You & Me"	Non-album single
2024	Izna	"Izna"	N/a
2024	Izna	"Timebomb"	N/a
2024	Izna	"IWALY"	N/a
2024	Izna	"Drip"	N/a
2024	Izna	"Fake It"	N/a
2024	G-Dragon	"Home Sweet Home" (feat. Taeyang and Daesung)	Übermensch
2024	Jeon Somi	"Ice Cream"	Non-album single
2024	Meovv	"Toxic"	My Eyes Open VVide
2024	Meovv	"Body"	My Eyes Open VVide
2024	Meovv	"Meow"	My Eyes Open VVide
2025	Meovv	"Hands Up"	My Eyes Open VVide
2025	Meovv	"Drop Top"	My Eyes Open VVide
2025	Meovv	"Lit Right Now"	My Eyes Open VVide
2025	Meovv	"Me Me Me"	Non-album singles
2025	Meovv	"Burning Up"	Non-album singles
2025	Izna	"Sign"	Non-album singles
2025	Izna	"Beep"	Non-album singles
2025	Izna	"Mamma Mia"	Not Just Pretty
2025	Izna	"Racecar"	Not Just Pretty
2025	Huntrix	"How It's Done"	KPop Demon Hunters
2025	Huntrix	"Golden"	KPop Demon Hunters
2025	Huntrix	"What It Sounds Like"	KPop Demon Hunters
2025	Blackpink	"Jump"	Deadline
2025	AllDay Project	"Famous"	Famous
2025	Jeon Somi	"Escapaed"	Chaotic & Confused
2025	Jeon Somi	"Extra"	Chaotic & Confused
2025	Jeon Somi	"Chaotic & Confused"	Chaotic & Confused
2025	Jeon Somi	"Closer"	Chaotic & Confused
2025	AllDay Project	"One More Time"	AllDay Project
2025	AllDay Project	"Look at Me"	AllDay Project
2025	AllDay Project	"You and I"	AllDay Project
2025	AllDay Project	"Where You At" (Annie and Woochan)	AllDay Project
2026	Blackpink	"Go"	Deadline
2026	Blackpink	"Fxxxboy"	Deadline
2026	Taeyang	"Live Fast Die Slow"	Quintessence
2026	Taeyang	"Would You"	Quintessence
2026	Meovv	"Ddi Ro Ri"	Bite Now
2026	Meovv	"In My Hands"	Bite Now
2026	Izna	"Metronome"	Set the Tempo
2026	Izna	"Dumb Hot!"	Handle With Care
2026	BigBang	"BiiiG"	Non-album single
