= Go Hard (Meovv song) =

- Digital cover

Single by Meovv

from the album Go Hard
- Language: Korean; English; Japanese
- B-side: "Indestructible"
- Released: October 12, 2026
- Length: 3:07
- Label: The Black Label
- Composers: DCF; Dominsuk; 24
- Lyricists: Narin; Teddy; Gawon; Ella; Anna; DCF; 24

Meovv singles chronology
"Ddi Ro Ri" (2026)	"Go Hard" (2026)

Meovv chronology
Bite Now (2026)	Go Hard (2026)

Music video
- "Go Hard" on YouTube

Professional ratings
Review scores
Source	Rating
IZM	1.5/5 stars

"Go Hard" is a song recorded by South Korean girl group Meovv for their first single album of the same name. It was released by The Black Label on October 12, 2026, along with its B-side track "Indestructible". Written by Meovv members, Narin, Gawon, Ella and Anna alongside Teddy, DCF and 24, "Go Hard" is about seeking confidence when faced with the challenges of growing up.

== Background and release ==
On October 1, 2026, The Black Label announced via the release of teaser photos that Meovv would be releasing their first single album Go Hard on October 12. Teaser videos and photos were released from October 2 to 3, followed by concept films and photos from October 4 to 5. On October 7, a music video teaser for the lead song "Go Hard" was released, and the album's track sampler was released on October 10. The song was released alongside its music video on October 12 upon the release of the single album.

== Composition ==
"Go Hard" was written by Narin, Teddy, Gawon, Ella, Anna, DCF and 24, composed by DCF, Dominsuk and 24, and arranged by Dominsuk, 24 and Kush. It features a "straightforward sound" with a "lyrical melody" in the verses which transitions into an intense beat with a repeated chant of "go hard" in the chorus. Lyrically, it is about the confidence of youth when stepping into the unknown, conveying a message of "seeking courage for oneself and the world". The song focuses on the pressures and challenges of growing up rather than "treating it as a clean transformation", and proposes to live in the moment and keep moving, "[refusing] to let obstacles decide that direction".

== Promotion ==
Meovv performed "Go Hard" on three music programs in the first week of promotion: Mnet's M Countdown on October 15, KBS's Music Bank on October 16, and MBC's Show! Music Core on October 17.

== Track listing ==
Go Hard track listing
No.	Title	Lyrics	Music	Arrangement(s)	Length
1.	"Go Hard"	Narin; Teddy; Gawon; Ella; Anna; DCF; 24	DCF; Dominsuk; 24	Dominsuk; 24; Kush	3:07
2.	"Indestructible"	Narin; Gawon; DCF; Upsahl; Anna; Ella	DCF; Upsahl; Dominsuk; Nohc; 24	Dominsuk; Nohc; 24	2:49
Total length:					5:56

== Charts ==
=== Weekly charts ===
Weekly chart performance for "Go Hard"
Chart (2026)	Peak position
South Korea (Circle)	107
South Korean Albums (Circle)	12

=== Monthly charts ===
Monthly chart performance for "Go Hard"
Chart (2026)	Peak Position
South Korean Albums (Circle)	33

== Release history ==
Release history for "Go Hard"
Region	Date	Format	Label
Various	October 12, 2026	Digital download; streaming	The Black Label
South Korea	October 12, 2026	CD	The Black Label
