= Claudia Valentina =

British singer and songwriter (born 2001)

- Born: Claudia Annabelle Cooney; 6 June 2000 (age 26); Guernsey, Bailiwick of Guernsey
- Genres: Pop
- Occupations: Singer; songwriter
- Instrument: Vocals
- Label: EMI

Claudia Annabelle Cooney (born 6 June 2000), known professionally as Claudia Valentina, is a British singer and songwriter from Guernsey.

== Biography ==
=== Early life ===
Valentina grew up on the island of Guernsey. She became interested in art from an early age and attended various stage schools. She was very interested in singing, dancing and theatre and first took part in Dance World Cup at Disneyland Paris in 2011, where she won gold with her group. Appearances in London's West End followed, including as Judy Hope in the musical Billy Elliot. At the age of 13, she moved to Los Angeles with her mother, where she continued to work as an actress and dancer. She also tried to gain a foothold as a pop singer and worked with songwriters such as Johan Carlsson, Matt Squire and Ross Golan.

=== Career ===
In 2019 Valentina featured on Wiley's My One in the main chorus. Valentina returned to London and worked with producer David Stewart and songwriter Jessica Agombar on her debut EP, which was released in 2020 via Universal Music Group. Her single "C'est La Vie" was released in 2021. Also that year, she also co-wrote the song The Motto, performed by DJ Tiësto and singer Ava Max. In 2022, Valentina was featured on the song High by the German rapper Cro. The song reached number 24 in the Austrian and German charts, as well as number 64 in the Swiss charts. She co-wrote and composed Jennie of K-pop girl group Blackpink's dance-pop and Miami bass single "Mantra" which was originally titled "Honda".

== Discography ==
=== Extended plays ===
List of EPs, with selected details
Title	Details
Claudia Valentina	Released: 20 October 2020; Label: EMI Records; Formats: Digital download
What Can I Tell U	Released: 3 April 2026; Label: Electric Feel; Formats: Digital download

=== Singles ===
==== As lead artist ====
Title	Year	Album or EP
"Seven"	2020	Claudia Valentina
"Obsessed"	2020	Claudia Valentina
"C’est La Vie"	2021	Non-album singles
"Extra Agenda"	2022	Non-album singles
"Sweat"	2022	Non-album singles
"D&G"	2024	Non-album singles
"Diamonds On My Teeth"	2024	Non-album singles
"When I'm High"	2025	Non-album singles
"Cry Them Dry"	2025	Non-album singles
"Candy"	2025	Non-album singles
"I Luv That Babe"	2025	Non-album singles
"Girly Things"	2026	What Can I Tell U
"Road Bby"	2026	What Can I Tell U

==== As featured artist ====
Title	Year	Peak chart positions			Certifications	Album or EP
Title	Year	AUT	GER	SWI	Certifications	Album or EP
"High" (Cro featuring Claudia Valentina)	2022	24	24	62	IFPI AUT: Gold	Non-album single
"Till I Die" (Anyma and Solomun featuring Claudia Valentina)	2023	—	—	—		The End of Genesys (Deluxe)

=== Songwriting credits ===
Song	Year	Artist	Album
"The Motto"	2021	Tiësto and Ava Max	Non-album single
"Cvnty"	2024	Adam Lambert	Afters
"Meow"	2024	Meovv	My Eyes Open VVide
"Mantra"	2024	Jennie	Ruby
"Toxic"	2024	Meovv	My Eyes Open VVide
"Drop Top"	2025	Meovv	My Eyes Open VVide
"Famous"	2025	AllDay Project	Famous
"Jump"	2025	Blackpink	Deadline
