= Zikai (singer) =

Swedish singer-songwriter

Isabelle Zikai Gbotto Carlsson (born December 2, 1997), better known as Zikai, is a Swedish singer-songwriter.

== Biography ==
Zikai has a Swedish mother and a father from Ivory Coast. When she was 15 years old, she was discovered by producer Mack Beats. She started her career writing songs for other artists in Sweden. In 2019, Isabelle started her own artist career under the name Zikai.

At the age of 15, Zikai began writing songs with the Swedish hip-hop elite and performed with among others, Silvana Imam, Michael Dida and Cherrie. Together with Eva Dahlgren, Zikai joined Silvana Imam on the song Fri which the three of them performed together at the musicfestival Bråvallafestivalen in 2017. She has previously written mostly for other artists. But the music she wrote began to be more about her own life and in 2019 her debut single was released.

As a songwriter, Zikai wrote songs with Alexander Oscar, Janice and many more. The song Number with Alexander Oscar sold gold in Denmark and the song Hearts Will Bleed written with Janice became a soundtrack to the game FIFA 20. On January 25, 2019, Zikai released her first song Mountain Peak, which got a big spread through P3, Swedish National Radio. In February, Zikai entered the stage at the Swedish Grammy awards 2019 and performed the song live. Grammy-winning GRADES made a remix of Mountain Peak which was released at the end of March, simultaneously mentioning Zikai as one of his new favorite artists. The song Beach Day was released on May 10, 2019, and in June Zikai was named as the Future Artist by P3. On September 27, the song Liquor Kisses was released. Dopest also listed Zikai as one of the most promising artists on the Swedish music scene in 2019. On December 2, Zikai ended the year with the single "Do You Love Me Still?".

In May 2020, Zikai's debut-EP "Make You Mine" was released together with the song "Champagne For Breakfast". She performed the song on Swedish TV-show Allsång på Skansen later that summer. She also was nominated for a Denniz Pop-Award for Rookie of the year. In autumn of 2020, she started a talk show called "Twenty Something Talkshow" on YouTube where she interviewed Swedish celebrities. She also performed her song "Twenty Something" on Musikkalendern and on Tolvslaget på Skansen together with SVEA where they performed their version of Rihanna's "Don't Stop The Music".

Zikai started 2021 with a performance on the TV-show På spåret and got nominated for Gaffa-prize "This year's breakthrough". In February the next single was released, "Stay This Way," together with JIM OUMA and Kes Kross, which she also got to perform on Swedish TV-show Go'kväll.

In April Zikai released her version of Paul Simon's "You Can Call Me Al". Most recently, Zikai won Sweden's Grammis 2021 for this year's soul/RnB for her debut EP "Make You Mine".

== Discography ==
=== Singles ===
- 2019 - "Mountain Peak"
- 2019 - "Mountain Peak - Grades Remix"
- 2019 - "Beach Day"
- 2019 - "Liquor Kisses"
- 2019 - "Do You Love Me Still?"
- 2020 - "SOS"
- 2020 - "Champagne For Breakfast"
- 2020 - "Twenty Something"
- 2020 - "Don't Stop The Music (with Svea)"
- 2021 - "Stay This Way (with Kes Kross)"
- 2021 - "You Can Call Me Al"

=== Songwriting Credits ===
- 2019 - Alexander Oscar - "Number"
- 2019 - Alexander Oscar - "Chemistry"
- 2019 - Katie Keller - "I'm Good"
- 2019 - Janice - "Hearts Will Bleed"
- 2019 - Liamoo - "Issues"
- 2019 - Anton., Andersson, Christine Balk - "Run. (Doppio)"
- 2020 - Yellow Claw, Weird Genius, Reikko - "Hush"
- 2020 - Alexander Oscar - "Bad Intenstions"
- 2020 - Peder Elias feat. Zikai - "Sharper"
- 2020 - Phlake - "I Could"
- 2020 - Phlake, Mercedes the Virus - "I Could"
- 2020 - Mullally feat. Zikai - "Fire"
- 2020 - DJ Soda & RayRay - "Obsession"
- 2024 - Meovv - "Meow"
- 2024 - Jennie - "Mantra"
- 2024 - Meovv - "Toxic"
- 2025 - Meovv - "Drop Top"
- 2025 - Blackpink - "Jump"
- 2025 - AllDay Project - "Famous"
- 2025 - Jeon Somi - "Closer"
- 2025 - AllDay Project - "Look at Me"
- 2026 - Meovv - "Ddi Ro Ri"
