= Flower (Jisoo song) =

2023 single by Jisoo

- Promotional graphic

Single by Jisoo

from the album Me
- Language: Korean
- B-side: "All Eyes on Me"
- Released: March 31, 2023
- Studio: The Black Label (Seoul)
- Genre: Pop; dance; trap
- Length: 2:54
- Label: YG; Interscope
- Composers: 24; VVN; Kush
- Lyricists: Vince; Kush; VVN; Teddy

Jisoo singles chronology
"Flower" (2023)	"Earthquake" (2025)

Music video
- ”Flower” on YouTube

"Flower" (Korean: 꽃; RR: Kkot) is the debut solo single by South Korean singer Jisoo. It was released through YG Entertainment and Interscope on March 31, 2023, as the lead single from her debut single album Me (2023). The lyrics of the song were written by Vince, Teddy, Kush, and VVN, while its music was composed by the latter two alongside 24, who also handled the production. Described as a mid-tempo dance, pop, and trap song that incorporates traditional Korean melodies and Caribbean elements, its lyrics are about overcoming a toxic relationship. The song marked Jisoo's only single release as a soloist under YG and Interscope, before her departure from the labels in December 2023.

"Flower" received favorable reviews from music critics, who complimented the poetic lyrics and fresh production, as well as Jisoo's vocals. The song was commercially successful and peaked at number two on the Billboard Global 200 and South Korea's Circle Digital Chart, becoming Jisoo's first top-ten hit on the charts. It topped the charts in Hong Kong, Malaysia, Singapore, Taiwan, and Vietnam, and reached the top 10 in Hungary, Indonesia, MENA, and the Philippines. The track also entered the top 40 of the Canadian Hot 100 and the UK Singles Chart, making it the highest-charting song by a female K-pop soloist on both charts at the time.

An accompanying music video was directed by Han Sa-min and uploaded onto YouTube simultaneously with the single's release. The video portrays Jisoo's journey through cinematic chapters, starting with her reflection on a breakup and culminating in her embracing her vulnerability and empowerment. To promote the song, the singer performed at the South Korean music program Inkigayo as well as Coachella in Indio, California. Accolades for "Flower" include Best Music Video and Best Dance Performance at the 2023 MAMA Awards, and Best Digital Song at the 38th Golden Disc Awards.

== Background and release ==
Following the release of bandmates Jennie's solo single "Solo" (2018), Rosé's solo single album R (2021), and Lisa's solo single album Lalisa (2021), attention turned towards Jisoo as the final member of Blackpink to debut as a soloist. On January 2, 2023, YG Entertainment confirmed that Jisoo was in the process of recording music for her single album and had completed filming the album's jacket photo shoots. On February 21, her label revealed that filming for her music video was underway in a top-secret location overseas, with the highest production budget they had ever invested into a Blackpink music video. On March 5, YG Entertainment, dropped a poster confirming that Jisoo's solo would be released on March 31, 2023. On March 19, the album's lead single was confirmed to be "Flower" with a teaser poster including the title written in hangul in the shape of a flower. On March 28, the music video teaser for "Flower" was released. "Flower" was released alongside its B side "All Eyes on Me" for streaming as the lead single from Me on March 31, 2023, by YG Entertainment.

== Composition and lyrics ==
"Flower" was written by Vince, Teddy, Kush, and VVN, with composition from the latter two alongside 24, who also handled the production. Musically, it is a mid-tempo pop, dance, and trap song that incorporates traditional Korean melodies, indie, and Caribbean elements. It is characterized by a "distinctive" bass sound, minimal arrangement, poetic lyrics, and "Jisoo's unique vocals". The lyrics talk about overcoming a toxic relationship, "leaving behind nothing but the whiff of flora". The word "Flower" was used as a metaphor to describe the singer's heartbreak, with the line, "Nothing is left but the scent of flower". Eventually the "flowers come to their own and bloom" as the protagonists leaves the toxic relationship and come to her own self, with the line, "Spring comes and we say bye bye bye." In terms of musical notation, the song was written in the key of A minor and has a tempo of 124 beats per minute.

== Critical reception ==
Professional ratings
Review scores
Source	Rating
The Harvard Crimson	4/5 stars
IZM	1.5/5 stars

Rhian Daly, writing for NME, praised the poetic lyricism as well as the fresh production of "Flower", naming it one of the best K-pop songs of the year. Daly noted that the song successfully managed "to mix elegance with inventiveness and elements of modern production with more traditional sounding sonics". For Rolling Stone, Tim Chan commended the song's "finger-snapping production" as well as Jisoo's confident vocal delivery, which he felt managed to make the lyrics feel personal as well as keep the listener's attention. Samantha H. Chung for The Harvard Crimson labeled "Flower" a "classy, laid-back debut", with appreciation for the verses's "sophisticated, mature groove that creates an almost indie sound" and the song's "compelling hook". Chung found that the song was well-fitting for Jisoo and praised her "understated charisma" for carrying the track, although she criticized its "meandering cadence". Writing for The Straits Times, Jan Lee praised the song as "pretty and elegant", though she felt it "would have benefited from a more memorable hook." Rolling Stone ranked "Flower" number 67 in their list of "The 100 Best Songs of 2023", calling it a "sophisticated track with a staccato, Latin-tinged melody and Caribbean-inspired percussion" that "feels instantly familiar yet unlike anything else on the radio". Grammy included it in their list of the "15 K-Pop Songs That Took 2023 By Storm", calling it "elegant and delicate", highlighting the song's overall production, and Jisoo's solo potential.

== Accolades ==
"Flower" won nine first place trophies on music programs in South Korea, including two Triple Crowns at Inkigayo and Show Champion. It also won Song of the Year at the Asian Pop Music Awards and received three nominations for the same category at the MAMA Awards, Melon Music Awards, and Golden Disc Awards respectively.

Awards and nominations for "Flower"
Year	Organization	Award	Result	Ref.
2023	Asian Pop Music Awards	Song of the Year (Overseas)	Won	
2023	Asian Pop Music Awards	Top 20 Songs of the Year (Overseas)	Won	
2023	Asian Pop Music Awards	Best Arranger (Overseas) (Note: Arranger: 24)	Nominated	
2023	Asian Pop Music Awards	Best Dance Performance (Overseas)	Nominated	
2023	Asian Pop Music Awards	Best Music Video (Overseas)	Nominated	
2023	Asian Pop Music Awards	Best Producer (Overseas) (Note: Producer: 24)	Nominated	
2023	BreakTudo Awards	International Hit	Nominated	
2023	The Fact Music Awards	Best Music: Spring	Nominated	
2023	MAMA Awards	Best Music Video	Won	
2023	MAMA Awards	Best Dance Performance Female Solo	Won	
2023	MAMA Awards	Song of the Year	Nominated	
2023	Melon Music Awards	Song of the Year	Nominated	
2024	Circle Chart Music Awards	Artist of the Year – Global Streaming	Won	
2024	Circle Chart Music Awards	Artist of the Year – Digital	Nominated	
2024	Circle Chart Music Awards	Artist of the Year – Streaming Unique Listeners	Nominated	
2024	Golden Disc Awards	Best Digital Song (Bonsang)	Won	
2024	Golden Disc Awards	Song of the Year (Daesang)	Nominated	
2024	iHeartRadio Music Awards	Best Music Video	Nominated	

Music program awards
Program	Date	Ref.
Show Champion	April 5, 2023	
Show Champion	April 12, 2023	
Show Champion	April 26, 2023	
M Countdown	April 13, 2023	
Music Bank	April 14, 2023	
Show! Music Core	April 15, 2023	
Inkigayo	April 16, 2023	
Inkigayo	April 30, 2023	
Inkigayo	July 2, 2023	

== Commercial performance ==
"Flower" debuted at number two on the Billboard Global 200 with 108.7 million streams and 21,000 downloads sold worldwide, marking Jisoo's first solo entry and top-ten song on the chart. It earned the third-biggest streaming start for an artist’s debut track, behind bandmate Lisa's "Lalisa" (2021) and Olivia Rodrigo's "Drivers License" (2021). The song also debuted at number two on the Billboard Global Excl. U.S. with 103.3 million streams and 16,000 downloads sold outside the U.S., marking Jisoo's first top-ten song on the latter chart as well. "Flower" surpassed 100 million streams on music streaming platform Spotify in just 32 days after its release, breaking the record held by Lisa for the fastest song by a female K-pop soloist to do so. In April 2024, it hit 400 million streams within 354 days of its release, setting a record as the most streamed song among Korean female solo singers on the platform. The song surpassed 1 million listeners on Shazam in March 2024, making it the most popular song by a Korean solo female singer in the past decade on the platform.

In South Korea, "Flower" debuted at number 33 on the 13th issued week (March 26–April 1, 2023) of the Circle Digital Chart, with less than two days of tracking. The following week, it rose to a peak at number two for the period dated April 2–8. On the Billboard South Korea Songs chart, it debuted at number one for the period dated April 15–21. The song also broke records on the South Korean music platform Genie, becoming the most streamed female solo debut song with 28.34 million streams by March 2024. In the United Kingdom, it debuted at number 38 on the UK Singles Chart, becoming the first top-40 hit by a K-pop female soloist and breaking the record held by Rosé's "On the Ground" (2021) as the highest-charting song by a K-pop female soloist at the time. The song debuted at number 40 on the New Zealand Singles Chart and number 33 on Australia's ARIA Singles Chart, making Jisoo the third Blackpink member to enter the top-50 on the latter. In the United States, "Flower" did not debut on the Billboard Hot 100, but entered the Bubbling Under Hot 100 chart at number four. It peaked at number ten on the Billboard Digital Song Sales chart and number two on the Billboard World Digital Song Sales chart with 6,000 downloads sold. In Canada, "Flower" debuted at number 30 on the Canadian Hot 100 and surpassed "On the Ground" as the highest-charting song by a K-pop solo female artist in the country at the time.

== Music video ==
=== Background ===
A music video for the song was directed by Han Sa-min, and uploaded to YouTube in conjunction with the release of the single album. The video was preceded by a short music video teaser released two days earlier on March 28. Upon release, the music video garnered over 44 million views, topping the worldwide trending list on YouTube, and became the most viewed video in 24 hours by a K-pop act in 2023. It went on to surpass 100 million views in less than 8 days. On April 5, a dance practice video for "Flower" was released. In it, Jisoo, dressed in a white gown with flowers on her palm, is accompanied by a series of backup dancers wearing all black.

=== Synopsis ===
A scene in the music video where Jisoo and her backup dancers form the shape of a pink flower.

The music video was shot in various locations in the United States, including the Millennium Biltmore Hotel, and Universal Studios. Lee Yoo-min of Kyunghyang Shinmun describes the video production as having a "cinematic style" with a "large-scale set" featuring "gorgeous mise-en-scène" that presents the singer's alter ego across multiple chapters. The video is divided into three chapters, "Next Day", "Same Time", and "Same Place". It is meant to show Jisoo's emotional journey after a breakup. The video begins with her being isolated in a flower-filled hotel room, depicting her "lost in her thoughts", before transitioning toward self-empowerment. In the final scenes, she tears off a rosette choker while wearing a black lace gown, symbolizing regained control.

=== Reception ===
Emily Heng, Beauty Editor of Vogue Singapore, wrote an article highlighting her five "breathtaking beauty moments" from the video and described each moment in detail. She noted how Jisoo pays homage to 1940s pin waves that "bring the glamour of old-school Hollywood", as well as hairstyles and "simple strokes" of makeup. Heng also noted elements like lashes, smoky eyes, and a color scheme that "exudes whimsy and charm". L'Officiel Malaysia remarked on Jisoo's fashion in the video and her showcasing of designer outfits from brands such as Dior, Versace, and the Korean designer Lee Y. GMA Network also noted how each of Jisoo's nine designer outfits gives different vibes, from dark to balletcore. Glitter Magazine drew attention to the symbolism in the video, including the use of floral imagery and outfit changes to depict themes of heartbreak and independence, showcasing Jisoo's growth and maturity. They also emphasized how this allows her to break free from her K-pop group image. The music video received a nomination for Best Music Video at the 2024 iHeartRadio Music Awards, and won Best Music Video at the 2023 MAMA Awards.

== Live performances ==
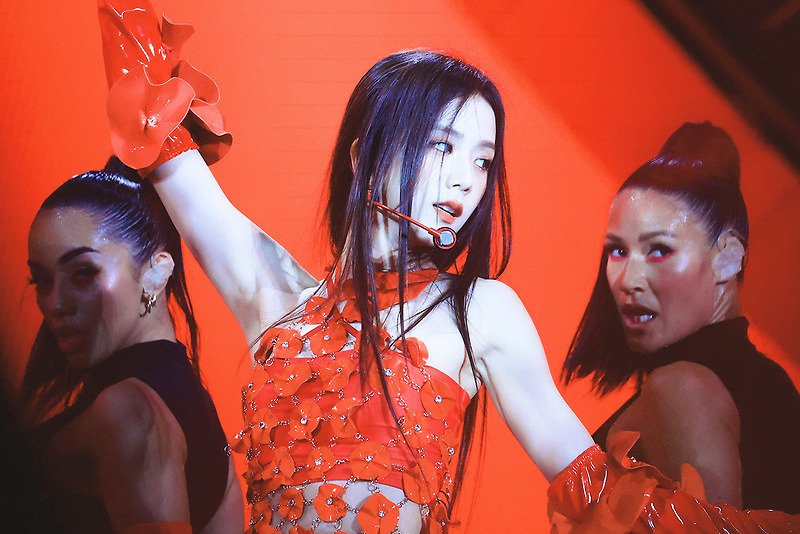
Jisoo performing “Flower” at Coachella 2023

On April 8, 2023, Jisoo performed "Flower" for the first time live during Blackpink's concert at the Tokyo Dome as part of the Born Pink World Tour. She performed the single on SBS's Inkigayo on April 9, where she showcased a "strong presence with red and black accents", notably featuring a red flower hanging from her hand. Jisoo performed the song again on the same show on April 16, 2023. "Flower" was also performed by Jisoo during Blackpink's set as the headlining act of Coachella in Indio, California on April 15, 2023. On July 2, she performed the song during Blackpink's set as the headlining act of BST Hyde Park in London.

== Credits and personnel ==
Credits adapted from the liner notes of Me.

Recording

- Recorded at The Black Label Studio (Seoul)
- Mixed at Gudwin Music Group Inc and The Lab (Los Angeles)
- Mastered at Sterling Sound (New York City)

Personnel

- Jisoo – vocals
- Vince – lyricist
- Kush – lyricist, composer
- VVN – lyricist, composer
- Teddy – lyricist
- 24 – composer, arranger
- Youngju Bang – recording engineer
- Josh Gudwin – mixing engineer
- Jason Roberts – mixing engineer
- Chris Gehringer – mastering engineer

== Charts ==
=== Weekly charts ===
Weekly chart performance
Chart (2023)	Peak position
Australia (ARIA)	33
Canada Hot 100 (Billboard)	30
France (SNEP)	131
Global 200 (Billboard)	2
Greece International (IFPI)	15
Hong Kong (Billboard)	1
Hungary (Single Top 40)	4
India (Billboard)	12
India International (IMI)	13
Indonesia (Billboard)	2
Ireland (IRMA)	74
Japan (Japan Hot 100)	45
Japan Heatseekers (Billboard Japan)	1
Japan Streaming (Oricon)	44
Lithuania (AGATA)	61
Malaysia (Billboard)	1
MENA (IFPI)	2
New Zealand (Recorded Music NZ)	40
Philippines (Billboard)	4
Singapore (RIAS)	1
South Korea (Circle)	2
Taiwan (Billboard)	1
Turkey (Billboard)	24
UK Singles (Official Charts)	38
US Bubbling Under Hot 100 (Billboard)	4
US Digital Song Sales (Billboard)	10
US World Digital Song Sales (Billboard)	2
Vietnam (Vietnam Hot 100)	1

=== Monthly charts ===
Monthly chart performance
Chart (2023)	Position
South Korea (Circle)	3

=== Year-end charts ===
Year-end chart performance
Chart (2023)	Position
Global 200 (Billboard)	160
South Korea (Circle)	17

== Certifications ==
Certifications
Region	Certification	Certified units/sales
Brazil (Pro-Música Brasil)	Platinum	40,000^{‡}
Canada (Music Canada)	Gold	40,000^{‡}
^{‡} Sales+streaming figures based on certification alone.

== Release history ==
Release formats for "Flower"
Region	Date	Format(s)	Label(s)	Ref.
Various	March 31, 2023	Digital download; streaming	YG; Interscope	

== See also ==
- List of Billboard Global 200 top-ten singles in 2023
- List of Inkigayo Chart winners (2023)
- List of K-pop songs on the Billboard charts
- List of M Countdown Chart winners (2023)
- List of Music Bank Chart winners (2023)
- List of number-one songs of 2023 (Hong Kong)
- List of number-one songs of 2023 (Malaysia)
- List of number-one songs of 2023 (Singapore)
- List of number-one songs of 2023 (Vietnam)
- List of Show! Music Core Chart winners (2023)
- List of Show Champion Chart winners (2023)
