= My Eyes Open VVide =

- Digital cover

EP by Meovv
- Released: May 12, 2025
- Length: 17:06
- Languages: Korean; English
- Label: The Black Label
- Producers: 24; Dominsuk; Ido; Kush; Jumpa; Tommy Brown; Leather Jacket; Jhune; Dirty Dave; Nohc

Meovv chronology
My Eyes Open VVide (2025)	Bite Now (2026)

Singles from My Eyes Open VVide
- 1. "Meow" Released: September 6, 2024; 2. "Toxic" Released: November 18, 2024; 3. "Body" Released: November 18, 2024; 4. "Hands Up" Released: April 28, 2025; 5. "Drop Top" Released: May 12, 2025

My Eyes Open VVide is the first extended play by South Korean girl group Meovv. Released by The Black Label on May 12, 2025, the EP is supported by the singles "Hands Up" and "Drop Top", and includes the group's previously released digital singles "Meow" and "Toxic".

== Background ==
Meovv debuted on September 6, 2024, with the digital single "Meow". Later that same year, they dropped their second single "Toxic", a double title track featuring the song of the same name and "Body".

On April 14, 2025, The Black Label announced Meovv's first EP My Eyes Open VVide, along with its pre-release single "Hands Up", which was released on April 28. A visual film in support of the EP was released on May 2, which was followed by the announcement of the EP's lead single, "Drop Top", three days later.

== Track listing ==
Track listing for My Eyes Open VVide
No.	Title	Lyrics	Music	Arrangement	Length
1.	"Hands Up"	Teddy; 24; Vince	Teddy; 24	24; Dominsik	3:12
2.	"Drop Top"	Teddy; Gawon; Vince; Kush; 24	Teddy; Kush; Zikai; Claudia Valentina; Bekuh Boom	Ido; 24; Kush	3:15
3.	"Meow"	Valentina; Teddy; Zikai; Billy Walsh; Vince	24; Jumpa; Valentina; Zikai	24; Jumpa	2:52
4.	"Body"	Teddy; Tommy Brown; Marqueze Parker; Theron Thomas; Steven Franks; Amanda Ratchford; Aliyah Scott; 24	Brown; Parker; Thomas; Franks; Ratchford; Scott; Teddy; 24	Brown; Leather Jacket; 24	2:03
5.	"Toxic"	Walsh; Zikai; Gawon; Narin; Valentina	24; Kush; Teddy; Zikai	24	3:10
6.	"Lit Right Now"	Teddy; Gawon; Narin; Vince; 24; Travis Garland; Malachiii; Walsh	Garland; Malachiii; Walsh; Rahul; Jhune; Dirty Dave; Teddy	Jhune; Dirty Dave; 24; Nohc	2:34
Total length:					17:06

== Charts ==
=== Weekly charts ===
Weekly chart performance for My Eyes Open VVide
Chart (2025)	Peak position
Japanese Albums (Oricon)	50
Japanese Download Albums (Billboard Japan)	38
South Korean Albums (Circle)	4
US Top Album Sales (Billboard)	10
US World Albums (Billboard)	4

=== Monthly chart ===
Monthly chart performance for My Eyes Open VVide
Chart (2025)	Position
South Korean Albums (Circle)	11

=== Year-end chart ===
Year-end chart performance for My Eyes Open VVide
Chart (2025)	Position
South Korean Albums (Circle)	83

== Certifications ==
Certifications for My Eyes Open VVide
Region	Certification	Certified units/sales
South Korea (KMCA)	Platinum	250,000^{^}
^{^} Shipments figures based on certification alone.

== Release history ==
Release history and formats for My Eyes Open VVide
Region	Date	Format	Label
Various	May 12, 2025	Digital download; streaming	The Black Label
South Korea	May 12, 2025	CD	The Black Label
