= Bite Now =

- Digital cover

EP by Meovv
- Released: June 1, 2026
- Length: 14:55
- Languages: Korean; English
- Label: The Black Label

Meovv chronology
My Eyes Open VVide (2025)	Bite Now (2026)	Go Hard (2026)

Singles from Bite Now
- 1. "Ddi Ro Ri" Released: June 1, 2026

Professional ratings
Review scores
Source	Rating
IZM	1.5/5 stars

Bite Now is the second extended play by South Korean girl group Meovv. It was released by The Black Label on June 1, 2026, and contains five tracks, including the lead single "Ddi Ro Ri".

== Background and release ==
On May 8, 2026, The Black Label released a mood board teasing Meovv's upcoming music release. Through the release of a mood film on May 11, it was announced that the group's second extended play titled Bite Now would be released on June 1. Teaser photos and a second mood film were released over the next two days. On May 15, more teaser photos were released. A trailer video and trailer photos were released on May 19 and 20, followed by a title poster featuring the melody of Toccata and Fugue in D minor on May 21. On May 23, another set of teaser photos were released. Upon the release of the album tracklist on May 25, the lead single was announced to be titled "Ddi Ro Ri". On May 28, a preview video for "Ddi Ro Ri" was released, showcasing moments of the members recording the song. The music video teaser for the song was released on the following day. On May 30, a highlight medley video of the album's tracks was released, followed by "Ddi Ro Ri" photos on the next day. The extended play was released alongside the music video for "Ddi Ro Ri" on June 1.

== Track listing ==
Track listing for Bite Now
No.	Title	Lyrics	Music	Arrangement(s)	Length
1.	"Hit 'Em"	Lukasz Gottwald; Theron Thomas; Lil Aaron; Shelailai	Lukasz Gottwald; Theron Thomas; Lil Aaron; Shelailai	Dr. Luke	2:48
2.	"Ddi Ro Ri"	Teddy; Narin; Ella; Gawon; Vince; 24; Kaine; Lil Aaron	24; Teddy; Kaine; Lil Aaron; Kush; Vince; Dominsuk; Zikai; DCF	24; Dominsuk	3:16
3.	"In My Hands"	Lukasz Gottwald; Vaughn Oliver; Malibu Babie; Anthony Watts; Megan Bülow; Narin; Gawon; 24	Lukasz Gottwald; Vaughn Oliver; Malibu Babie; Anthony Watts; Megan Bülow; Teddy; 24; Ido	Vaughn Oliver; Malibu Babie; 24; Ido	2:26
4.	"Favorite Song"	Narin; DCF; Upsahl; Gawon; 24	Kush; Nohc; Ido; DCF; Upsahl; Lee Tae-wook	Ido; Nohc	3:18
5.	"Revenge"	Chrishan; Imani; Narin; Gawon; Ella; Malachiii	Chrishan; Imani; Malachiii	Mob; Saint Mino; Tommy Brown	3:07
Total length:					14:55

== Charts ==
=== Weekly charts ===
Weekly chart performance for Bite Now
Chart (2026)	Peak position
Japanese Albums (Oricon)	23
Japanese Combined Albums (Oricon)	35
Japanese Download Albums (Billboard Japan)	46
South Korean Albums (Circle)	4
US Top Album Sales (Billboard)	26
US World Albums (Billboard)	7

=== Monthly charts ===
Monthly chart performance for Bite Now
Chart (2026)	Peak position
South Korean Albums (Circle)	12

== Release history ==
Release history for Bite Now
Region	Date	Format	Label
South Korea	June 1, 2026	CD	The Black Label
Various	June 1, 2026	Digital download; streaming	The Black Label
