= Meow (Meovv song) =

Single by Meovv

from the EP My Eyes Open VVide
- Language: Korean
- Released: September 6, 2024
- Genre: Hip-hop
- Length: 2:52
- Label: The Black Label
- Composers: 24; Jumpa; Claudia Valentina; Zikai
- Lyricists: Billy (Walsh); Claudia Valentina; Teddy; Vince; Zikai

Meovv singles chronology
| "Meow" (2024) | "Toxic" (2024) |

Music video
- "Meow" on YouTube

Professional ratings
Review scores
| Source | Rating |
|---|---|
| IZM | 1/5 stars |

"Meow" is the debut single by South Korean girl group Meovv. It was released by The Black Label on September 6, 2024.

== Background and release ==
On August 16, 2024, The Black Label announced their first girl group Meovv. On August 21, the group's first member and child model Ella Gross was introduced. The remaining members — Gawon, Sooin, Anna, and Narin — were revealed on subsequent days. On September 2, the group was announced to be debuting four days later. On September 5, a teaser for the group's debut single, "Meow", was released. "Meow" was released digitally on September 6, 2024.

== Credits and personnel ==
Adapted from Melon Music credits:

- Meovv – vocals
- Claudia Valentina – lyrics, composition
- Teddy Park – lyrics
- Zikai – lyrics, composition
- Billy Walsh – lyrics
- Vince – lyrics
- 24 – composition, arrangement
- Jumpa – composition, arrangement

== Charts ==
=== Weekly charts ===
Weekly chart performance for "Meow"
| Chart (2024) | Peak position |
|---|---|
| Global Excl. US (Billboard) | 120 |
| Japan Heatseekers (Billboard Japan) | 4 |
| Malaysia International (RIM) | 17 |
| New Zealand Hot Singles (RMNZ) | 20 |
| Singapore Regional (RIAS) | 11 |
| South Korea (Circle) | 30 |
| US World Digital Song Sales (Billboard) | 10 |

=== Monthly charts ===
Monthly chart performance for "Meow"
| Chart (2024) | Peak position |
|---|---|
| South Korea (Circle) | 38 |

== Release history ==
Release history for "Meow"
| Region | Date | Format | Label |
|---|---|---|---|
| Various | September 6, 2024 | Digital download; streaming | The Black Label |
