= All Eyes on Me (Jisoo song) =

2023 song by Jisoo

Song by Jisoo

from the album Me
- Language: Korean; English
- A-side: "Flower"
- Released: March 31, 2023
- Studio: The Black Label (Seoul)
- Genre: Electropop; dance-pop; EDM
- Length: 2:44
- Label: YG; Interscope
- Composers: Teddy; R. Tee; 24; VVN
- Lyricists: Teddy; Vince

Audio video
- "All Eyes on Me" on YouTube

"All Eyes on Me" is a song recorded by South Korean singer and Blackpink member Jisoo. It is the second track on her debut single album, Me (2023), which was released on March 31, 2023, through YG and Interscope. It is an upbeat electropop, dance-pop and EDM song with lyrics about a self-confident woman demanding her lover's attention. The track was written by Teddy, Vince and R. Tee, who handled the production alongside 24.

"All Eyes on Me" peaked at number 78 on the Billboard Global 200 and number four on US World Digital Song Sales, and was a top-ten hit in Hungary, Malaysia, Taiwan, and Vietnam. The track received generally favorable reviews for its lyrics and production showing a different side of Jisoo, with critics finding it a strong complement to the album's title track "Flower".

== Background ==
On March 5, teasers were uploaded to Blackpink's social media accounts, confirming that Jisoo's solo project would be released on March 31, 2023. On March 8, the album's title was announced to be Me in a teaser poster featuring a close-up of Jisoo in floral accessories against a green background. "All Eyes on Me" was announced as the second track of Me on March 27 in a poster containing the full tracklist and credits for the album. It was released worldwide on March 31 through YG and Interscope alongside the title track "Flower".

== Lyrics and production ==
"All Eyes on Me" was written by Teddy and Vince and composed by Teddy alongside VVN, R. Tee, and 24, the latter two of which also handled the production. It is an upbeat electropop, dance-pop and EDM song that incorporates elements of synth-pop in the outro. In a Q&A with the South Korean media outlet Osen, Jisoo explained that "The affection for 'All Eyes On Me' is so special that it was prepared as a candidate for the title track. Feeling cheerful yet deadly? I think a lot of people will like it as much as I do." The lyrics represent an evolution from the heartbreak anthem of "Flower", instead depicting a self-confident woman who knows her worth and what she deserves, with lines such as “One is not enough, look into my eyes/ I don't want half, just look at me only/ That's a given, it's not so greedy.” The singer is depicted as empowered by love, but not at the expense of the dominance she has.

== Critical reception ==
Writing for The Harvard Crimson, Samantha H. Chung for described it as "a strong track that complements 'Flower' well." She praised the self-confident lyrics and explained that "the song shows a different side of Jisoo while highlighting her distinctive voice and style." Rhian Daly for NME wrote that "although not as poetic" as "Flower", "'All Eyes On Me's words still pack an alluring quality at times"; she additionally felt that the song was lacking musically in comparison to "Flower". Writing for The Straits Times, Jan Lee praised the song as an "upbeat dance number that feels like it would be a fun, stomping anthem to hear live." Taylor Glasby named "All Eyes on Me" one of the top 50 best K-pop tracks of 2023, calling it the "warmer, more demanding and much pacier sister" of "Flower". She praised the "drama embedded into the pre-chorus and the bouncing lift of the chorus" for keeping on delivering.

== Commercial performance ==
"All Eyes on Me" debuted at number 78 on the Billboard Global 200 and at number 42 on the Billboard Global Excl. U.S. chart. In South Korea, the song debuted at number 179 on the Circle Digital Chart on the thirteenth issued week (March 26–April 1), with less than two days of tracking. The following week, it rose to a peak at number 102 for the period dated April 2–8. In the United States, the song did not enter the Billboard Hot 100, but peaked at number 19 on the Billboard Digital Song Sales chart and number four on the Billboard World Digital Song Sales chart with 3,000 downloads sold. It also entered the top ten on Hungary's Single Top 40, Billboard's Malaysia Songs and Taiwan Songs, and the Billboard Vietnam Hot 100.

== Live performances ==
On August 11, 2023, Jisoo performed "All Eyes on Me" for the first time at MetLife Stadium in East Rutherford, New Jersey for the encore leg of Blackpink's Born Pink World Tour.

== Credits and personnel ==
Credits adapted from the liner notes of Me

Recording

- Recorded at The Black Label Studio (Seoul)
- Mixed at Gudwin Music Group Inc and The Lab (Los Angeles)
- Mastered at Sterling Sound (New York City)

Personnel

- Jisoo – vocals
- Teddy – lyricist, composer
- Vince – lyricist
- R. Tee – composer, arranger
- 24 – composer, arranger
- VVN – composer
- Youngju Bang – recording engineer
- Josh Gudwin – mixing engineer
- Jason Roberts – mixing engineer
- Chris Gehringer – mastering engineer

== Charts ==
=== Weekly charts ===
Weekly chart performance
Chart (2023)	Peak position
Australia Digital Tracks (ARIA)	22
Canadian Digital Song Sales (Billboard)	17
Global 200 (Billboard)	78
Hong Kong (Billboard)	15
Hungary (Single Top 40)	10
Malaysia (Billboard)	8
New Zealand Hot Singles (RMNZ)	18
Philippines (Billboard)	19
Singapore (RIAS)	11
South Korea (Circle)	102
Taiwan (Billboard)	6
UK Singles Downloads (OCC)	27
US Digital Song Sales (Billboard)	19
US World Digital Song Sales (Billboard)	4
Vietnam (Vietnam Hot 100)	6

=== Monthly charts ===
Monthly chart performance
Chart (2023)	Position
South Korea (Circle)	137

== Certifications ==
Certifications
Region	Certification	Certified units/sales
Brazil (Pro-Música Brasil)	Gold	20,000^{‡}
^{‡} Sales+streaming figures based on certification alone.

== See also ==
- List of K-pop songs on the Billboard charts
