= Hands Up (Meovv song) =

Single by Meovv

from the EP My Eyes Open VVide
- Language: Korean; English
- Released: April 28, 2025
- Genre: Brazilian funk
- Length: 3:12
- Label: The Black Label
- Composers: Teddy; 24
- Lyricists: Teddy; Vince; 24

Meovv singles chronology
"Toxic" (2024)	"Hands Up" (2025)	"Drop Top" (2025)

Music video
- "Hands Up" on YouTube

"Hands Up" (stylized in all caps) is a song recorded by the South Korean girl group Meovv. It was released on April 28, 2025, as a pre-release single for their first EP, My Eyes Open VVide.

== Background and release ==
On April 14, 2025, The Black Label posted a teaser announcing that Meovv will pre-release "Hands Up" on April 28, ahead of the release of their debut EP, My Eyes Open VVide. Concept photos for the single was released the next day, displaying the silhouette of the members in "chic yet elegant" poses, which was followed by a teaser video on April 17. On April 24, a teaser for the music video for the single was released. The single was released digitally on April 28, along with its accompanying music video.

== Composition ==
"Hands Up" was written by Teddy, Vince and 24, and composed by Teddy and 24, with the latter handling arrangement alongside Dominsik. It has a duration of three minutes, and is written in key of A minor with a tempo of 140 beats per minute. "Hands Up" is described as a Brazilian funk that perfectly showcases Meovv's unique identity with its fast, flashy rhythm and unique synthesizer sound.

== Music video ==
The music video was released alongside the song by The Black Label on April 28. In the visual, Meovv's members could be seen training to play alkkagi, a traditional Korean board game. Towards the end, they face off against the "alkkagi god", who turns out to be a little boy.

== Live performances ==
On May 1, 2025, Meovv performed "Hands Up" live for the first time on the South Korean music program M Countdown broadcast by Mnet.

== Accolades ==
Music program awards
Program	Date	Ref.
M Countdown	May 8, 2025	
M Countdown	May 15, 2025	

== Credits and personnel ==
Credits adapted from Melon.

- Meovv – vocals
- Teddy – lyricist, composer
- 24 – lyricist, composer, arranger
- Vince – lyricist
- Dominsik – arranger

== Charts ==
=== Weekly charts ===
Weekly chart performance for "Hands Up"
Chart (2025)	Peak position
Global Excl. US (Billboard)	119
Japan Heatseekers (Billboard Japan)	1
Japan Hot Shot Songs (Billboard Japan)	9
Japan Streaming Songs (Billboard Japan)	95
Malaysia (Billboard)	21
Malaysia International (RIM)	10
New Zealand Hot Singles (RMNZ)	38
Singapore (RIAS)	19
South Korea (Circle)	12
Taiwan (Billboard)	11
US World Digital Song Sales (Billboard)	9

=== Monthly charts ===
Monthly chart performance for "Hands Up"
Chart (2025)	Position
South Korea (Circle)	15

=== Year-end charts ===
Year-end chart performance for "Hands Up"
Chart (2025)	Position
Japan Heatseekers Songs (Billboard Japan)	19
South Korea (Circle)	67

== Release history ==
Release history for "Hands Up"
Region	Date	Format	Label
Various	April 28, 2025	Digital download; streaming	The Black Label
