= Me (single album) =

- Digital cover

Single album by Jisoo
- Released: March 31, 2023
- Recorded: 2022–2023
- Studio: The Black Label (Seoul)
- Genres: Pop; trap; EDM
- Length: 5:37
- Languages: Korean; English
- Labels: YG; Interscope
- Producers: 24; R. Tee

Jisoo chronology
Me (2023)	Amortage (2025)

Singles from Me
- 1. "Flower" Released: March 31, 2023

Me is the debut single album by South Korean singer Jisoo. It was released on March 31, 2023, through YG Entertainment and Interscope Records. It is a pop and trap record that blends dance, synth-pop, traditional Korean instruments, and Caribbean production. Its lyrics explore romantic affairs, overcoming a relationship, and Jisoo's self-development as a person. Jisoo worked with long-time collaborators 24 and R. Tee.

Me debuted at number one on the Circle Album Chart with 1.03 million copies sold in less than two days, becoming the best-selling album by a female soloist in the chart's history and the first ever to surpass one million sales. It was certified million by the Korea Music Content Association (KMCA) in May 2023 and has since surpassed 1.5 million copies sold. The album received generally favorable reviews from music critics, who complimented its sophisticated lyrics and production that highlighted Jisoo's unique vocals.

"Flower" was released as the lead single on the same day the album was released. The song peaked at number two on the Billboard Global 200 and the Circle Digital Chart and became the highest-charting song by a female K-pop soloist on the Canadian Hot 100 and the UK Singles Chart.

== Background ==
Following the release of bandmates Jennie's solo single "Solo" (2018), Rosé's solo single album R (2021), and Lisa's solo single album Lalisa (2021), attention turned towards Jisoo as the final member of Blackpink to debut as a soloist. During an interview with Rolling Stone, the singer shared that she felt not sure about pursuing a music career outside of the group and was still figuring out the direction it would go in. On January 2, 2023, YG Entertainment confirmed that Jisoo was in the process of recording music for her single album and had completed filming the album's jacket photo shoots. On February 21, her label revealed that filming for her music video was underway in a top-secret location overseas, with the highest production budget they have ever invested into a Blackpink music video.

== Composition ==
Me is a pop and trap record that blends dance, synth-pop, traditional Korean instruments and Caribbean elements. It is an exploration of Jisoo’s romantic affairs and self-development as a person. It highlights her vocal strengths through "easygoing flows and insatiable lyrics" as she narrates a story about a broken-hearted girl who overcomes and leaves a toxic relationship with "untouchable confidence" through the two tracks.

The single album opens with its lead single "Flower", a mid-tempo dance, pop and trap song that incorporates traditional Korean melodies and Caribbean elements. It is characterized by a "distinctive" bass sound, minimal arrangement, poetic lyrics, and "Jisoo's unique vocals." Its lyrics talk about overcoming a toxic relationship, where the protagonist leaves the relationship with "leaving behind nothing but the whiff of flora." In the song the word "Flower" was used as a metaphor to describe the singer's heartbreak, in line with the lyrics, "Nothing is left but the scent of flower." Eventually the "flowers come to their own and bloom" as the protagonists leave the toxic relationship and come to her own self, with the lyrics “Spring comes and we say bye bye bye."

The album's second track “All Eyes on Me” is an upbeat electro-pop, dance-pop and EDM song that incorporates synth-pop elements. Its lyrics are about a woman who knows her worth and what she deserves, with lyrics: “One is not enough, look into my eyes/ I don't want half, just look at me only/ That's a given, it's not so greedy.”

== Conception and title ==
"While preparing for the single, a question mark floated in my head. I wanted to show a new and diverse side of myself while protecting myself. This is a single of 'me' myself, created after countless considerations to look inside and express myself. That's why the title of the single is also "나" which means "me", i participated in the overall part of the single, and I worked with that determination from the beginning to the end. I feel myself growing and becoming stronger as I go through the process of discovering new charms that I didn't even know existed."

— Jisoo's introduction of the album, Newsis

The name of the single album, Me, is a representation of Jisoo's strong aspirations and confidence, capturing her distinct color and original beauty as a solo artist. It also refers to the Chinese character (美), which means beauty. By giving a double meaning to the title, Jisoo sheds light not only on her unique music style but also on the visual aesthetics of her album. In a Q&A with The Korea Times, Jisoo explained that "Through Me, I want to display my unexplored side without ditching my originality. It is an EP about myself. As I worked on it, I discovered my hidden charms and felt like I was growing up. I took part in its overall production, sharing my ideas about music, the concept, and music video, among other things."

=== Aesthetics ===
Jisoo used bold red, black-and-white colors with floral accents in her social media posts and clothing during the promotion of Me. On March 15 and 21, the singer released two visual films for the single album. In the first one, Jisoo is seen wearing a "luxe" zebra print outfit while surrounded by "striking" red flowers, accompanied by traditional-sounding instrumentals. The second video features primarily a black-and-white palette. Jisoo appears in a black crop top and a "satin-finished", wide skirt.

== Release and promotion ==
On March 5, teasers were uploaded to Blackpink’s social media accounts, confirming that Jisoo's solo project would be released on March 31, 2023. The same day, the single album was made available for pre-order in two standard versions alongside Kit and purple vinyl versions. Jisoo directly participated in the design to "increase the value of the collection". On March 8, the album's title was announced to be Me in a teaser poster featuring a close-up of Jisoo in floral accessories against a green background. A second teaser poster was released on March 12 depicting Jisoo in a white ruffled dress against a black background. On March 15, Jisoo unveiled the first visual teaser for the album with a red aesthetic. On March 19, the name of the album's lead single was announced to be "Flower". On March 21, Jisoo released the second visual teaser for the album with a black aesthetic. The full tracklist and credits for the album were released on March 27. Me was released worldwide on March 31 through YG and Interscope in conjunction with the music video for "Flower". In celebration of her comeback, the singer held an online live broadcast an hour before the release to talk about the album and music video. On April 7, Jisoo appeared as the first guest on the second season of Lee Young-ji's show Not Much Prepared on YouTube. On April 8, Jisoo featured on Wired's Autocomplete Interview series on YouTube, in which she answered the web's most frequently asked questions.

== Critical reception ==
Professional ratings
Review scores
Source	Rating
NME	4/5 stars

Rhian Daly writing for NME awarded the album 4 out of 5 stars, describing the album as a showcase of two sides of Jisoo's artistry. In particular, Daly found the lead single "Flower" one of the best K-pop songs of the year and praised it for "managing to mix elegance with inventiveness and elements of modern production with more traditional sounding sonics." On the other hand, she thought the B-side track "All Eyes on Me" was lacking musically in comparison to "Flower", though the lyrics "still pack[ed] an alluring quality at times". Writing for Rolling Stone, Tim Chan praised the "finger-snapping production" and Jisoo's confident vocal delivery on "Flower" and characterized "All Eyes on Me" as a "head-nodding pop track." Samantha H. Chung for The Harvard Crimson labeled "Flower" a "classy, laid-back debut" that was well-suited to Jisoo's "understated charisma", while "All Eyes on Me" was a strong complement that showed "a different side of Jisoo while highlighting her distinctive voice and style."

== Accolades ==
Awards and nominations for Me
Year	Organization	Award	Result	Ref.
2023	Asian Pop Music Awards	People's Choice Award (Overseas)	4th place	
2023	Seoul Music Awards	Main Award (Bonsang)	Nominated	
2023	Seoul Music Awards	Korean Wave Award	Nominated	
2023	Seoul Music Awards	Popularity Award	Nominated	

== Commercial performance ==
Me surpassed 510,000 pre-orders in two days and 840,000 pre-orders in a week. In just two weeks, the single album surpassed 950,000 pre-orders, the highest figure ever by a female K-pop solo artist. On March 28, YG Entertainment announced that Me had exceeded 1.24 million pre-orders in three weeks, making it the first album by a K-pop female soloist to sell one million copies. As of March 30, the single album had surpassed 1.31 million pre-orders. According to Korea's Hanteo Chart, the single album sold 876,249 copies on the first day and 1,172,351 copies on the first week of release, breaking the record previously held by bandmate Lisa's single album Lalisa for the highest first-week sales among female soloists and making Jisoo the first-ever million-selling female K-pop solo artist. The physical edition debuted at number one on the Circle Album Chart with 875,922 copies sold, while the Nemo version debuted at number six with 88,632 copies sold and the Kit version debuted at number seven with 69,520 copies sold, all in less than two days of tracking. The album remained at number one for its second week, becoming the first album by a female soloist to top the chart for multiple weeks. Me ranked at number 27 on the year-end Circle Album Chart with 1,147,208 copies sold in 2023, while the Nemo version ranked at number 92 with 227,997 copies sold. It has since surpassed 1.5 million copies sold, remaining the best-selling album by a female soloist on the chart as of December 2024.

== Track listing ==
Me track listing
No.	Title	Lyrics	Music	Arrangement	Length
1.	"Flower" (꽃; Kkot)	Vince; Kush; VVN; Teddy	24; VVN; Kush	24	2:53
2.	"All Eyes on Me"	Teddy; Vince	Teddy; R. Tee; 24; VVN	24; R. Tee	2:44
Total length:					5:37

Me – CD only (bonus tracks)
No.	Title	Music	Arrangement	Length
3.	"Flower" (Instrumental)	24; VVN; Kush	24	2:53
4.	"All Eyes on Me" (Instrumental)	Teddy; R. Tee; 24; VVN	24; R. Tee	2:44
Total length:				11:14

== Personnel ==
Credits adapted from album liner notes and Tidal.

Musicians

- Jisoo – vocals, creative director
- Teddy – creative director, lyricist (all tracks), composer (track 1)
- VVN – lyricist (track 1), composer (all tracks)
- Kush – lyricist (track 1), composer (track 1)
- Vince – lyricist (all tracks)
- 24 – composer (all tracks)
- R. Tee – composer (track 2)

Technical

- 24 – arranger (all tracks), producer (all tracks)
- R. Tee – composer (track 2), producer (track 2)
- Youngju Bang – recording engineer (all tracks)
- Josh Gudwin – mix engineer (all tracks)
- Jason Roberts – mix engineer (all tracks)
- Chris Gehringer – mastering engineer (all tracks)

Design

- Hyojin Jeong, Sungmin Yook, Dayeon Kim, Dami Hwang, Heewon Moon (YG), Laundry Office – design
- Jaehyun Choe, Bin Seo, Jisu Hong, Jung Lee – visual
- Yujin Jung – music marketing
- Heejune Kim (Co-Op) – photographer
- Minhee Park – stylist
- Nakyung Lee, Sichun Kim (Set Calla7) – set
- Seonyeong Lee – hair
- Myungsun Lee (Woosun) – make up
- Eunkyung Park (Unistella) – nail

Management

- YG Entertainment – executive producer
- Sukyung Park, Boin Kwon, Hyojeong Jeon, Jieun Kim – A&R
- Yoonjeong Kim, Suji Park, Jeongeun Jeong – publishing
- Heonpyo Park – head of artist management group
- Byoungyoung Lee, Seho Kim, Saerom Lee, Jonggook Lee, Jeongan Lee – artist management
- Bokyung Hwang, Minsuk Yang – chief executive officer

== Charts ==
=== Weekly charts ===
Weekly chart performance for Me
Chart (2023)	Peak position
Hungary (Single Top 40)	2
Japan (Oricon)	24
Japan Combined Singles (Oricon)	46
Japan Top Singles Sales (Billboard Japan)	8
South Korean Albums (Circle)	1
South Korean Albums (Circle) Nemo version	4
South Korean Albums (Circle) Kit version	7
South Korean Albums (Circle) LP version	9

=== Monthly charts ===
Monthly chart performance for Me
Chart (2023)	Peak position
South Korean Albums (Circle)	3
South Korean Albums (Circle) Nemo version	15
South Korean Albums (Circle) Kit version	16
South Korean Albums (Circle) LP version	27

=== Year-end charts ===
Year-end chart performance for Me
Chart (2023)	Position
South Korean Albums (Circle)	27
South Korean Albums (Circle) Nemo version	92

== Certifications and sales ==
Certifications for Me
Region	Certification	Certified units/sales
South Korea (KMCA)	Million	1,550,058

== Release history ==
Release dates and formats for Me
Region	Date	Format	Label	Ref.
Various	March 31, 2023	CD; digital download; streaming	YG; Interscope	
South Korea	March 31, 2023	Kit	YG	
South Korea	August 1, 2023	LP	YG	

== See also ==
- List of best-selling albums in South Korea
- List of certified albums in South Korea
- List of Circle Album Chart number ones of 2023
