= Toxic (Meovv song) =

Single by Meovv

from the EP My Eyes Open VVide
- Language: English
- A-side: "Body" (double A-side)
- Released: November 18, 2024
- Genre: R&B
- Length: 3:10
- Label: The Black Label
- Composers: 24; Kush; Teddy; Zikai
- Lyricists: Billy Walsh; Zikai; Gawon; Narin; Claudia Valentina

Meovv singles chronology
"Meow" (2024)	"Toxic" (2024)	"Hands Up" (2025)

Music video
- "Toxic" on YouTube

"Toxic" is a song recorded by South Korean girl group Meovv. It was released by The Black Label on November 18, 2024, as part of a double title track for their second single of the same name along with "Body".

== Background and release ==
Meovv debuted on September 6, 2024, with the single "Meow". On November 12, 2024, The Black Label announced Meovv's second single "Toxic", which will be a double title track release including the track of the same name and "Body". The album cover for the single was unveiled a day later, depicting the silhouette of a cat in front of a green neon light. On November 14, a teaser poster was released, showing the group members in black and white, and wearing ballet-style outfits. A day later, a teaser for the song's music video was released. "Toxic" was released on November 18, 2024. Two days later, a special performance video for "Body" was released.

== Track listing ==
"Toxic" track listing
No.	Title	Lyrics	Music	Arrangement	Length
1.	"Toxic"	Billy Walsh; Zikai; Gawon; Narin; Claudia Valentina	24; Kush; Teddy; Zikai	24	3:10
2.	"Body"	Teddy; Tommy Brown; Marqueze Parker; Theron Thomas; Steven Franks; Amanda Ratchford; Aliyah Scott; 24	Brown; Parker; Thomas; Franks; Ratchford; Scott; Teddy; 24	Brown; Leather Jacket; 24	2:03
Total length:					5:13

== Charts ==
Chart performance for "Toxic"
Chart (2024)	Peak position
South Korea (Circle)	190

== Release history ==
Release history for "Toxic"
Region	Date	Format	Label
Various	November 18, 2024	Digital download; streaming	The Black Label
