= Ella Gross =

American singer, model and actress (born 2008)

- Gross in 2026
- Born: Ella McKenzie Gross; December 1, 2008 (age 17); Los Angeles, California, U.S.
- Occupations: Singer; model; actress
- Years active: 2011–present
- Agent: The Black Label
- Musical career
- Origin: Seoul, South Korea
- Genre: K-pop
- Instrument: Vocals
- Years active: 2024–present
- Label: The Black Label
- Member of: Meovv

Signature
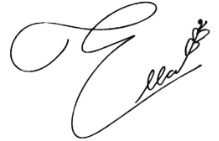

Ella McKenzie Gross (/ɡroʊs/, German: [ɡʁoːs]; born December 1, 2008), also known mononymously as Ella, is an American singer, model, and actress based in South Korea. She first began her career as a model at age two and has modeled for fashion brands such as H&M, Levi's, and GAP. As a singer, she debuted as a member of the South Korean girl group Meovv in September 2024, under The Black Label.

== Early life ==
Ella McKenzie Gross was born on December 1, 2008 in Los Angeles, California, and also has a Korean name, Nabi (나비). She is of Korean descent through her mother who hails from South Korea, and of German descent through her father, an American national. Gross has a brother who is two years younger than her. She trained in ballet and mixed martial arts (MMA) as a child.

== Career ==
=== 2011–2023: Modeling career ===
Cited as a "prodigy" in both modelling and acting, Gross first featured on the cover of a magazine at age two, after she was scouted at a park in South Korea. In this time, her father, a former prosecutor in the military, was dispatched to the country from Los Angeles, leading to the whole family's visit. Her mother, who also previously modelled for children's clothing, positively considered the offer. Following a year and a half after starting kindergarten, Gross resumed her modelling advancements; her mother, who worked as a lawyer, had since assisted her daughter's work along her side. Signed to Lvl Up Management, and later L.A. Models, Gross modelled for brands: Zara, H&M, GAP, Fendi, Levi's, and Tommy Hilfiger; and debuted on the runway at age nine at the Tokyo Girls Collection A/W 2018 fashion show held at Saitama Super Arena, Tokyo, Japan, in front of an audience of 30,000 viewers. Gross thereafter walked the runways of Tokyo Girls Collection S/S 2019 and 2019 New York Fashion Week. In July 2019, she also appeared in a commercial for Baskin Robbins in South Korea.

Departing from her former agency, Gross signed with The Black Label in July 2018 to manage her modelling career. Its co-founder, Teddy Park, stated: "She has a special voice that is completely capable for being a singer as well", deeming the potential of joining the music industry. Media reports stated that Rosé of Blackpink had expressed interest in a demo recorded by Gross. In the midst of her business trips from Los Angeles to South Korea, she further learned dance routines from choreographers in the country. Gross commenced an acting career with the U.S. based company, Monster Talent Management, which also manages the likes of Zendaya and Dylan Minnette.

=== 2024–present: Debut with Meovv ===
Gross at Tiffany & Co. Pop up store event in December 2024

In February 2024, a series of leaked photos of The Black Label trainees, rumored to be members of the agency's upcoming girl group, quickly spread online, which notably featured Gross. In the same month, the agency announced its plans to launch a new girl group in the first half of 2024. On August 22, 2024, The Black Label revealed Gross as the first member of their company's first girl group, Meovv, which debuted on September 6.

== Public image ==
Gross attained interest in the United States and abroad for her biracial look, and for her resemblance to a young Miranda Kerr. Korean media outlets cited her as a young Song Hye-kyo, or was nicknamed as "little Jennie" by Blackpink fans following a picture posted with the singer. Her early modeling career and exposure on social media contributed to her gaining over one million followers on Instagram during her childhood. As of May 2026, she has over 4 million followers on Instagram. She has received media attention for her modelling career and fashion industry activities, including campaigns and editorial work for major brands.

== Other ventures ==
=== Endorsements ===
Gross attending the Miu Miu pop-up opening in October 2026

In April 2025, she was named a brand ambassador for Miu Miu. In July, she became the endorser of Lotte Chilsung Cider Zero.

In December 2025, she was named global ambassador for American makeup brand, MAC Cosmetics.

=== Philanthropy ===
Gross has used her platform to address topics including climate change and the war in Ukraine, and served amidst a jury of judges for the United Nations High Commissioner for Refugees (UNHCR) X Uniqlo project entitled "Youth with Refugees Art Contest" in 2023.

== Discography ==
=== Songwriting credits ===
Year	Artist	Song	Album	Notes
2026	Meovv	"Ddi Ro Ri"	Bite Now	As a lyricist
2026	Meovv	"Revenge"	Bite Now	As a lyricist
2026	Meovv	"Go Hard"	Go Hard	As a lyricist
2026	Meovv	"Indestructible"	Go Hard	As a lyricist

== Filmography ==
=== Film ===
Year	Title	Role	Ref.
2019	Malibu Rescue: The Movie	Sasha Gossard	
2020	Malibu Rescue: The Next Wave	Sasha Gossard	

=== Television series ===
Year	Title	Role	Notes	Ref.
2018	Heathers	Young Betty	—N/a	
2019	Malibu Rescue	Sasha Gossard	Episode 4 (Sand and Deliver)	
2019	Teachers	Julie	Season 3; Episodes 18–19	
2020	Star Trek: Picard	Young Soji	Episode 6 (The Impossible Box)	
2022	Best Foot Forward	Ella	Episode 6 (Halloween)	

=== Music video appearances ===
Year	Song title	Artist	Ref.
2018	"Hello Tutorial" (멋지게 인사하는 법) (featuring Seulgi of Red Velvet)	Zion.T	
