= Whimsical =

Whimsy or Whimsical may refer to:

- Whimsical (horse) (foaled 1903), winner of the 1906 Preakness Stakes
- Whimsical Stakes, an annual Canadian Thoroughbred horse race at Woodbine Racetrack in Toronto, Ontario
- "Whimsical", a 1997 song by Days of the New from Days of the New
- Whimsey glass, a form of glass art
- Wade Ceramics, manufacturers of the mid-20th-century animal figurines known as "Wade Whimsies"
