= Meovv =

South Korean girl group

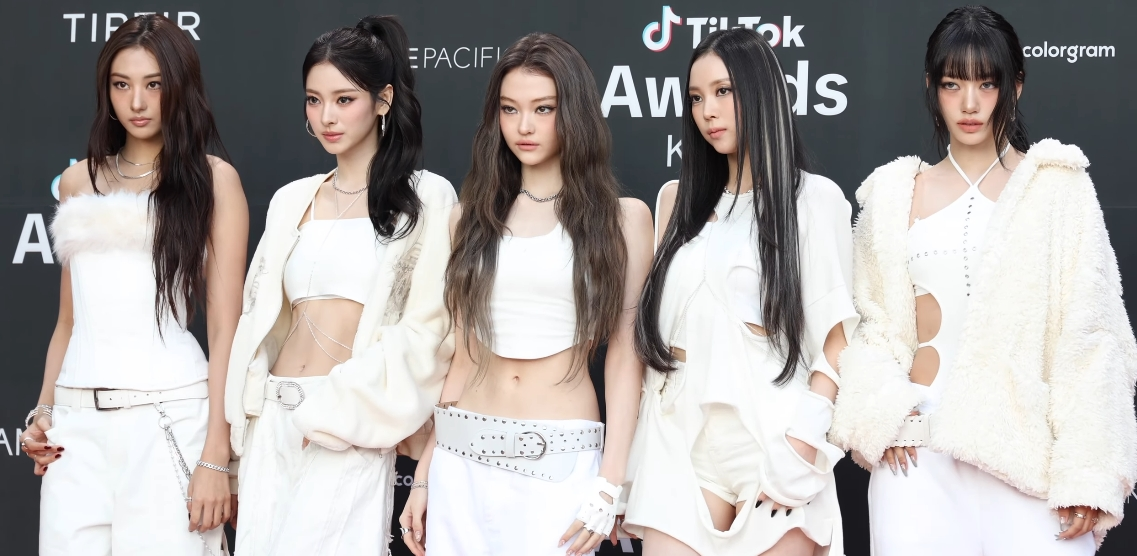
- Meovv in October 2025; Left to right: Gawon, Anna, Ella, Narin, Sooin

Background information
- Origin: Seoul, South Korea
- Genre: K-pop
- Years active: 2024–present
- Labels: The Black Label; Universal Japan; Capitol
- Members: Sooin; Gawon; Anna; Narin; Ella

Meovv (pronounced "meow"; Korean: 미야오; RR: Miyao; stylized in all caps) is a South Korean girl group formed and managed by The Black Label. The group consists of five members: Sooin, Gawon, Anna, Narin, and Ella. They debuted on September 6, 2024, with the release of their digital single "Meow".

== Name ==
The group's name, Meovv, is an acronym for "My Eyes Open VVide". Member Ella responded to expressing the team name's "W" with two 'V's, saying, "I wanted to give visual fun", and "I liked it better because it felt like it represented each of the members".

== History ==
=== Pre-debut activities and formation ===
Most members of Meovv held experience in entertainment, modeling, music, and dance, prior to their acceptance into The Black Label. American model Ella Gross entered the industry at age two and has been featured on several fashion campaigns such as Zara, H&M, and GAP. Gawon was a former YG Entertainment trainee and a former model who starred in Adidas ads. Japanese member Anna started her career as a child model and was an exclusive model for Seventeen Japan from October 2019 to December 2021.

In March 2024, the agency announced its plans to launch a new girl group in the first half of 2024. In March, it was revealed that The Black Label applied for the trademark "Mèovv" across multiple categories, suggesting its potential use for their new girl group.

=== 2024–present: Introduction and debut ===
MEOVV's official logo.

On August 16, 2024, The Black Label launched official social media accounts and posted animated teasers for their first girl group. These teasers also featured a large black cover being taken off a building, revealing five giant black cats sitting atop, hinting at the groups potential number of members. On August 19, The Black Label released a special teaser on Twitter, announcing that the agency would release content on August 21. That same day, The Black Label posted a video about Ella Gross on their official YouTube channel, making her the first member of Meovv to be revealed. Gawon was revealed on August 23, followed by Sooin, Anna, and Narin, each after two days intervals. Thereafter, The Black Label announced that Meovv had signed a partnership contract with Capitol Records ahead of their debut.

A video trailer and announcement posters featuring all five members were released on September 4, 2024, alongside the announcement of the release of the group's debut digital single, "Meow". On September 6, the single was released alongside its music video. The group's second single, "Toxic", was released on November 18.

Meovv's first EP, My Eyes Open VVide, was announced on April 14, 2025. A track from the EP, "Hands Up", was pre-released on April 28, and gave the group their first music broadcast trophy since debut on M Countdown on May 8, while the EP's lead single, "Drop Top", was released alongside the EP on May 12. The group released their first Japanese single, "Me Me Me", on July 29, which also serves as a promotional track for the Japanese cosmetics brand Kao. In September, it was reported that Meovv will be releasing new music the following month. They then released the digital single "Burning Up" on October 14.

On May 11, 2026, The Black Label announced that Meovv would be releasing their second EP, Bite Now, on June 1. On October 1, The Black Label announced that Meovv's first single album Go Hard would be released on October 12.

== Endorsements ==
In February 2025, Meovv was selected as brand ambassador of the beauty brand L'Oréal Paris. On July 29, the group was introduced as brand ambassador for Kao Corporation's new hair care product "MEMEME", which was launched on that date with the release of the song of the same name and announced as the group's first Japanese single under Universal Music Japan.

== Members ==
- Sooin (수인)
- Gawon (가원)
- Anna (안나)
- Narin (나린)
- Ella (엘라)

== Discography ==
=== Extended plays ===
List of extended plays, showing selected details, selected chart positions, sales figures, and certifications
Title	Details	Peak chart positions				Sales	Certifications
Title	Details	KOR	JPN	US Sales	US World	Sales	Certifications
My Eyes Open VVide	Released: May 12, 2025; Labels: The Black Label; Formats: CD, digital download, streaming	4	50	10	4	KOR: 282,580; JPN: 738	KMCA: Platinum
Bite Now	Released: June 1, 2026; Labels: The Black Label; Formats: CD, digital download, streaming	4	23	26	7	KOR: 199,541; JPN: 2,341	

=== Single albums ===
List of single albums, showing selected details, selected chart positions, and sales figures
Title	Details	Peak chart positions	Sales
Title	Details	KOR	Sales
Go Hard	Released: October 12, 2026; Labels: The Black Label; Formats: CD, digital download, streaming	12	KOR: 51,294

=== Singles ===
==== Korean singles ====
List of Korean singles, showing year released, selected chart positions, and name of the album
Title	Year	Peak chart positions							Album
Title	Year	KOR	JPN Heat.	MLY Intl.	NZ Hot	SGP	US World	WW Excl. US	Album
"Meow"	2024	30	4	17	20	— (Note: "Meow" did not enter the Official Singapore Chart, but peaked at number 11 on the Regional Chart.)	10	120	My Eyes Open VVide
"Toxic"	2024	190	—	—	—	—	—	—	My Eyes Open VVide
"Body" (Note: "Body" was released as part of a double title track for Meovv's second single "Toxic".)	2024	— (Note: "Body" did not enter the Circle Digital Chart, but it peaked at number 41 on the component download chart.)	—	—	—	—	—	—	My Eyes Open VVide
"Hands Up"	2025	12	1	10	38	19	9	119	My Eyes Open VVide
"Drop Top"	2025	95	—	—	—	—	—	—	My Eyes Open VVide
"Burning Up"	2025	57	—	—	37	— (Note: "Burning Up" did not enter the Official Singapore Chart, but peaked at number 15 on the Regional Chart.)	5	—	Non-album single
"Ddi Ro Ri"	2026	60	—	—	—	— (Note: Ddi Ro Ri" did not enter the Official Singapore Chart, but peaked at number 27 on the Regional Chart.)	—	—	Bite Now
"Go Hard"	2026	107	—	—	—	—	—	—	Go Hard
"—" denotes a recording that did not chart or was not released in that territory.

==== Japanese singles ====
List of Japanese singles, showing year released, and name of the album
Title	Year	Album
"Me Me Me"	2025	Non-album single

=== Other charted songs ===
List of other charted songs, showing year released, selected chart positions, and name of the album
Title	Year	Peak chart positions	Album
Title	Year	KOR DL	Album
"Lit Right Now"	2025	87	My Eyes Open VVide
"Hit 'Em"	2026	56	Bite Now
"In My Hands"	2026	58	Bite Now
"Favorite Song"	2026	62	Bite Now
"Revenge"	2026	85	Bite Now
"Indestructible"	2026	57	Go Hard

== Videography ==
=== Music videos ===
Title	Year	Director(s)	Ref.
"Meow"	2024	Han Samin	
"Toxic"	2024	Roh Sangyoon	
"Hands Up"	2025	Ha Jung-hoon, Lee Hye Sung (Hattrick)	
"Drop Top"	2025	Lee Youngeum (OGG Visual)	
"Burning Up"	2025	Ha Jung-hoon (Hattrick)	
"Ddi Ro Ri"	2026	Rima Yoon (Rigend Film)	
"In My Hands"	2026	Unknown	
"Go Hard"	2026	Unknown	

=== Other videos ===
Title	Year	Director(s)	Ref.
"Body" (Performance Video)	2024	Roh Sangyoon	
"Hit 'Em" (Performance Video)	2026	Unknown	

== Filmography ==
=== Web shows ===
Year	Title	Notes	Ref.
2024–2026	Catch Meovv	Variety show series	

== Live performances ==
=== Music festivals ===
Event	Date	City	Country	Venue	Performed song(s)	Ref.
Superpop Korea	May 17, 2025	Goyang	South Korea	KINTEX	"Meow"; "Body"; "Drop Top"; "Hands Up"	
SBS Gayo Daejeon Summer	July 26, 2025	Goyang	South Korea	KINTEX 1	"Hands Up"	
KCON LA 2025	August 2, 2025	Los Angeles	United States	LA Convention Center	"Meow"; "Body"; "Toxic"; "Lit Right Now"; "Hands Up"; "Drop Top"	
KCON LA 2025	August 3, 2025	Los Angeles	United States	Crypto.com Arena	"Hands Up"; "Drop Top"; "Abracadabra" (Cover)	
Incheon Airport Sky Festival 2025	November 8, 2025	Incheon	South Korea	Inspire Arena	"Burning Up"; "Body"; "Meow"; "Drop Top"; "Hands Up"	
SBS Gayo Daejeon 2025	December 25, 2025	Incheon	South Korea	Inspire Arena	"Toxic"; "Burning Up"	

=== Awards shows ===
Event	Dates	Venue	City	Country	Performed song(s)	Ref.
2024 MAMA Awards	November 23, 2024	Kyocera Dome Osaka	Osaka	Japan	"Meow"; "Body"	
8th The Fact Music Awards	September 20, 2025	Macao Outdoor Performance Venue	Macau	China	"Meow"; "Hands Up"	
TikTok Awards Korea	October 25, 2025	Korea University's Hwajeong Gymnasium	Seoul	South Korea	"Hands Up"; "Burning Up"	
2025 Korea Grand Music Awards	November 14, 2025	Inspire Arena	Incheon	South Korea	"Body"; "Burning Up"; "Hands Up"	
2025 MAMA Awards	November 28, 2025	Kai Tak Stadium	Hong Kong	China	"Burning Up"	
10th Asia Artist Awards	December 6, 2025	Kaohsiung National Stadium	Kaohsiung	Taiwan	"Burning Up"; "Hands Up"	

=== Other live performances ===
List of miscellaneous live performances, showing event/venue names, dates, locations, and songs performed where applicable
Event	Date	City	Country	Performed song(s)	Ref.
The Light Year Tour	February 1, 2025	Incheon	South Korea	"Meow"; "Body"	
The Light Year Tour	February 2, 2025	Incheon	South Korea	"Meow"; "Body"	
41st Mynavi Tokyo Girls Collection 2025 A/W	September 6, 2025	Saitama	Japan		

== Awards and nominations ==
Name of the award ceremony, year presented, category, nominee of the award, and the result of the nomination
Award ceremony	Year	Category	Nominee / Work	Result	Ref.
Asia Artist Awards	2025	Best Music Video	"Hands Up"	Won	
Asia Artist Awards	2025	Best Musician – Group	Meovv	Won	
D Awards	2025	Best Girl Group Popularity Award	Meovv	Nominated	
The Fact Music Awards	2025	Global Hot-Trend Award	Meovv	Won	
Hanteo Music Awards	2025	Emerging Artist	Meovv	Nominated	
Hanteo Music Awards	2025	Global Artist – Africa	Meovv	Nominated	
Hanteo Music Awards	2025	Global Artist – Asia	Meovv	Nominated	
Hanteo Music Awards	2025	Global Artist – Europe	Meovv	Nominated	
Hanteo Music Awards	2025	Global Artist – North America	Meovv	Nominated	
Hanteo Music Awards	2025	Global Artist – Oceania	Meovv	Nominated	
Hanteo Music Awards	2025	Global Artist – South America	Meovv	Nominated	
Hanteo Music Awards	2025	Rookie of the Year – Female	Meovv	Nominated	
Hanteo Music Awards	2025	WhosFandom Award – Female	Meovv	Nominated	
iHeartRadio Music Awards	2026	Best New Artist (K-pop)	Meovv	Nominated	
Korea Grand Music Awards	2025	IS Rookie	Meovv	Won	
Korea Grand Music Awards	2026	Best Artist	Meovv	Won	
MAMA Awards	2024	Artist of the Year	Meovv	Nominated	
MAMA Awards	2024	Best New Female Artist	Meovv	Nominated	
MAMA Awards	2024	Fans' Choice Top 10 – Female	Meovv	Nominated	
MAMA Awards	2024	Favorite Rising Artist	Meovv	Won	
MAMA Awards	2025	Fans' Choice Top 10 – Female	Meovv	Nominated	
MAMA Awards	2025	Song of the Year	"Drop Top"	Nominated	
Melon Music Awards	2024	Best New Artist	Meovv	Nominated	
Melon Music Awards	2025	Top 10 Artist	Meovv	Nominated	
Melon Music Awards	2025	Berriz Global Fans' Choice	Meovv	Nominated	
Seoul Music Awards	2025	Rookie of the Year	Meovv	Nominated	
Seoul Music Awards	2025	Main Prize (Bonsang)	Meovv	Nominated	
Seoul Music Awards	2025	Popularity Award	Meovv	Nominated	
Seoul Music Awards	2025	K-Wave Special Award	Meovv	Nominated	
Seoul Music Awards	2025	K-pop World Choice – Group	Meovv	Nominated	
TikTok Awards Korea	2025	Impact Award	Meovv	Won	
TMElive International Music Awards	2026	Breakout International Performance	Meovv	Won	
