= The Black Label =

South Korean record label

- Headquarters building for The Black Label
- Type: Private (associate)
- Industry: Entertainment
- Founded: 2015
- Founder: Teddy; Kush
- Headquarters: Hannam-dong, Yongsan District, Seoul, South Korea
- Key people: Jeong Kyung-in (CEO); Teddy (Chief Creative Officer)
- Owner: Teddy (42%); Saehan Venture Investment (28%); YG Entertainment (21.59%)
- Website: theblacklabel.com

The Black Label Inc. (Korean: 더 블랙 레이블; stylized in all caps) is a South Korean record label and an associate company of YG Entertainment. It was founded in 2015 by YG producer Teddy Park and Kush.

== History ==
On September 22, 2015, YG Entertainment announced the creation of the independent sub-label to be headed by YG producers Teddy Park and Kush. On March 17, 2016, Zion.T signed with the label. On May 3, 2017, Okasian signed an exclusive contract with the label. The label is also home to Jeon Somi, who signed with the label in September 2018, and debuted on June 13, 2019.

On November 16, 2020, as per the quarterly stock report of YG Entertainment, the label was converted to an associate company status. On December 26, 2022, the company announced Taeyang joined the label but remained a member of Big Bang.

In January 2023, actor Park Bo-gum signed with the label. In April 2023, The Black Label formed a joint venture with Thailand's largest conglomerate Charoen Pokphand Group called The Black Sea to expand its label into the Southeast Asian region.

On June 18, 2024, The Black Label announced that they had signed a management contract with Rosé from Blackpink for her solo endeavors. On July 1, 2024, The Black Label announced the end of their exclusive contract with Zion.T. On August 16, 2024, The Black Label announced the launch of their first girl group, Meovv. The group debuted on September 6, 2024.

On August 14, 2026, The Black Label announced that they had signed an exclusive contract with soccer player, Lee Kang-in. On November 13, it was announced that CL had signed an exclusive contract with the label.

== Artists ==
=== Recording artists ===
Groups

- Meovv
- AllDay Project

Soloists

- Jeon Somi
- Taeyang
- Rosé
- Vince
- CL

=== Producers ===
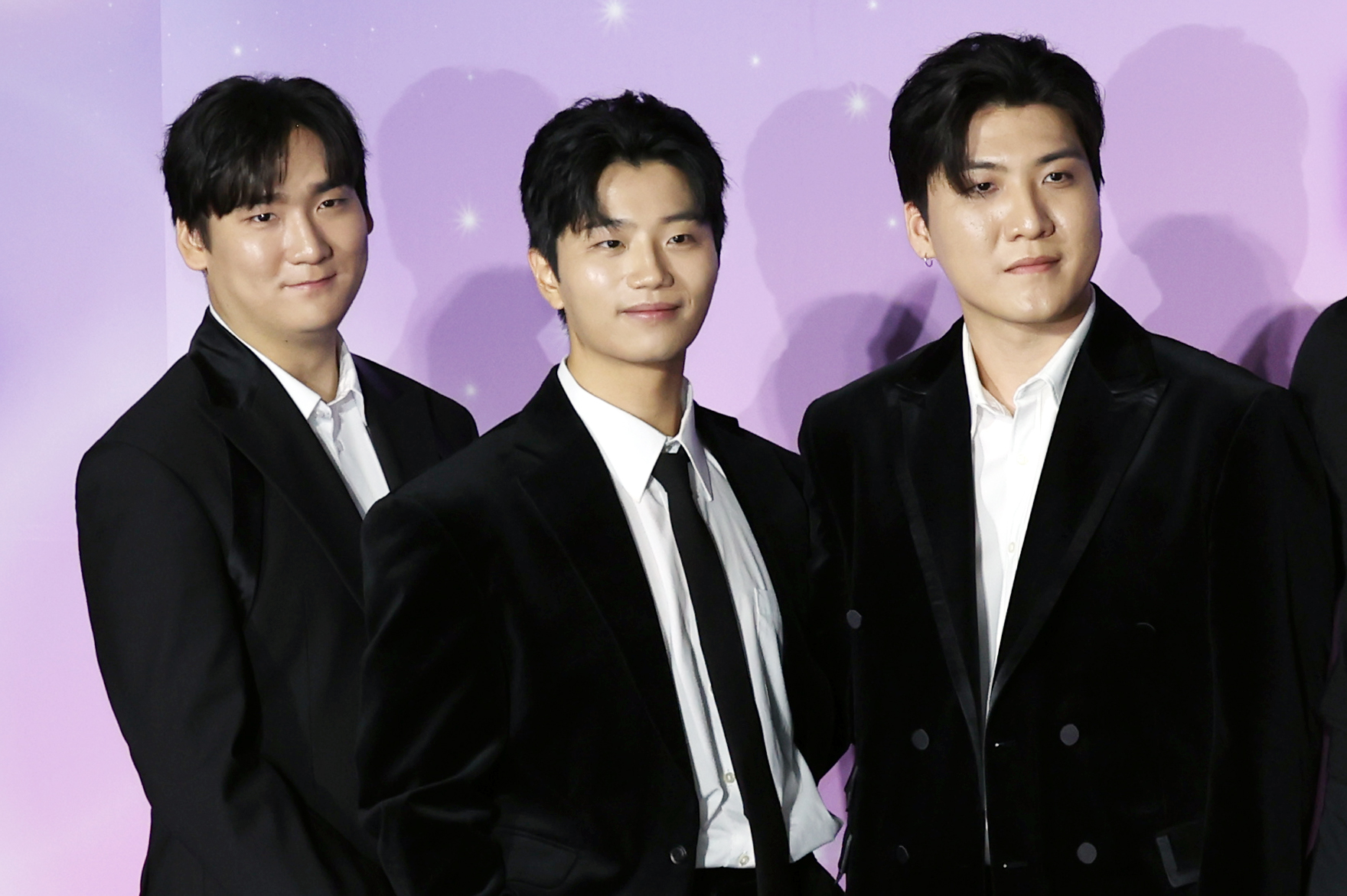
Zhun, Yuhan, and NHD of IDO in 2026

- Teddy
- VVN
- Jeon Somi
- Taeyang
- IDO
- Dominsuk
- Vince

=== Actors and models ===
- Ella Gross
- Im Si-wan
- Kwak Dong-yeon
- Lee Jong-won
- Park Bo-gum

=== Athletes ===
- Lee Kang-in

== Former artists ==
- Zion.T
- Loren
- Bryan Chase
- R.Tee

=== Former actors ===
- Lee Ju-myoung (Note: Moved to YG Entertainment under YG Stage.)

=== Former producers ===
- Okasian
- Zion.T
- Loren
- R.Tee

== Partnerships ==
- The Black Sea (joint venture with Charoen Pokphand Group)
- Izna (co-producing with WakeOne)

=== Music distribution ===
The Black Label records are distributed by the following:

- YG Plus (Overall since 2020)
- Interscope Records (for Bryan Chase, Jeon Somi, and Taeyang)
- 88rising (for Løren only)
- Capitol Records (for Meovv only)
- Atlantic Records (for Rosé only)
