= List of awards and nominations received by Lisa =

Lisa awards and nominations
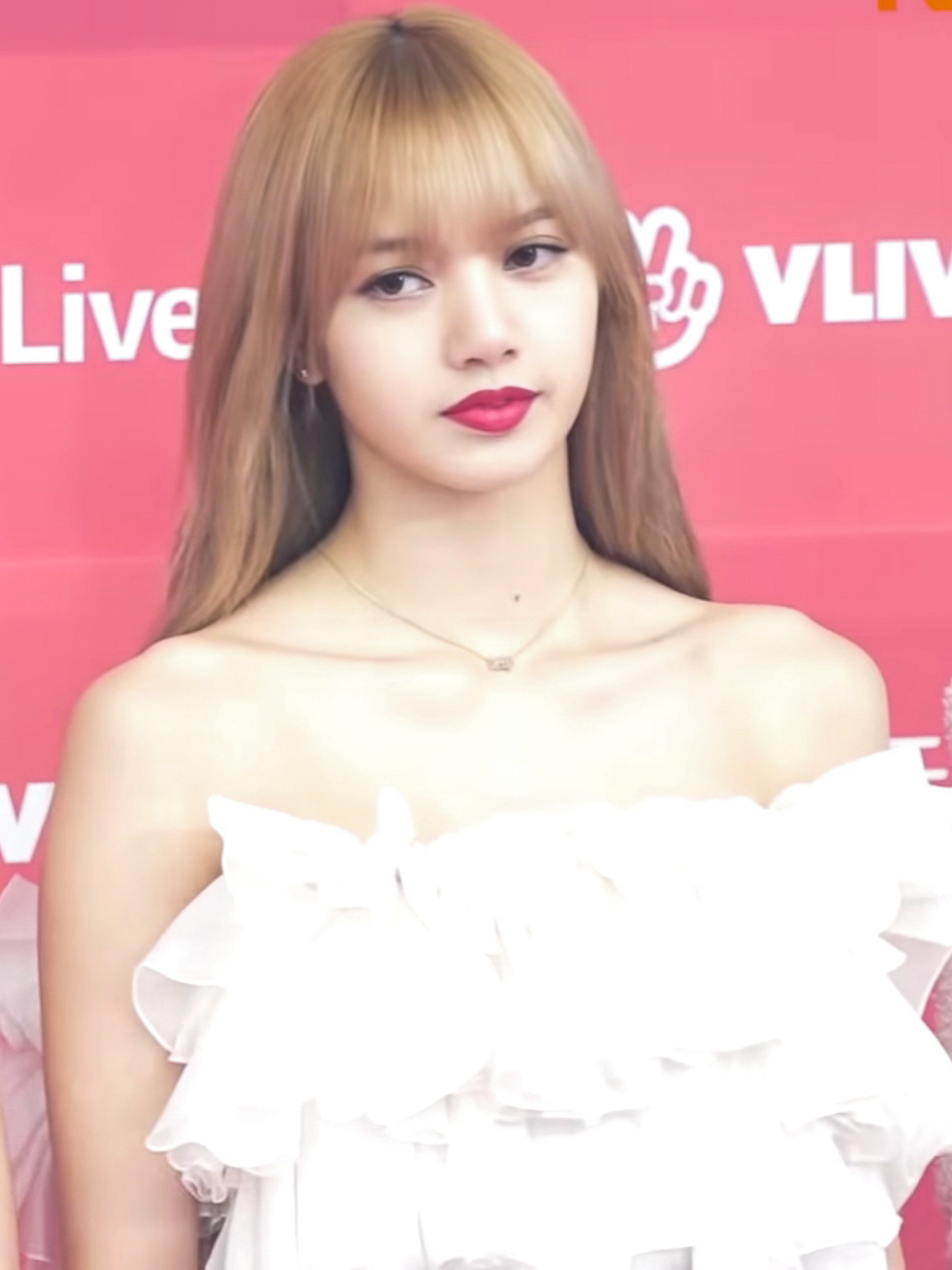
- Lisa at the 33rd Golden Disc Awards in January 2019
Awards and nominations
Award	Wins	Nominations
Actor Awards	0	1
Asia Artist Awards	0	4
Asian Pop Music Awards	7	16
Berlin Commercial Festival	0	5
Bravo Otto	1	1
BreakTudo Awards	1	7
Clio Awards	2	2
Creative Circle Awards	1	1
D Awards	0	3
The Fact Music Awards	0	1
Gaon Chart Music Awards	1	1
Hanteo Music Awards	2	9
Hollywood Music Video Awards	2	3
iHeartRadio Music Awards	0	7
Joox Thailand Music Awards	1	4
K-World Dream Awards	0	1
KM Chart Awards	0	1
Korea Grand Music Awards	0	3
Korea First Brand Awards	0	1
Las Culturistas Culture Awards	0	1
Mnet Asian Music Awards	1	7
MTV Europe Music Awards	3	6
MTV MIAW Awards	0	4
MTV Video Music Awards	4	10
Myx Music Awards	0	1
Nickelodeon Kids' Choice Awards	0	1
Premios Lo Nuestro	0	1
SEC Awards	1	5
Seoul Music Awards	0	3
Thailand Master Youth Club	1	1
UK Music Video Awards	0	1
Webby Awards	1	1
Weibo Starlight Awards	2	2

Totals (Note: Certain award groups do not simply award one winner. They acknowledge several different recipients, have runners-up, and have third place. Since this is a specific recognition and is different from losing an award, runner-up mentions are considered wins in this award tally. For simplification and to avoid errors, each award in this list has been presumed to have had a prior nomination.)
- Wins: 31
- Nominations: 115

Lisa is a Thai rapper, singer, and actress and a member of the South Korean girl group Blackpink. She released her debut single album Lalisa and its lead single of the same name in September 2021. The project led Lisa to break several Guinness World Records, including for the most viewed YouTube music video by a solo artist in 24 hours, the fastest female solo K-pop artist to reach 1 billion streams on Spotify, and the first album by a solo K-pop artist to reach 1 billion streams on Spotify. The album's second single "Money" also earned a Guinness World Record as the first K-pop track by a solo artist to reach 1 billion streams on Spotify. Lisa was awarded Best K-Pop at both the 2022 MTV Video Music Awards and the 2022 MTV Europe Music Awards, earning two Guinness World Records as the first K-pop soloist in history to win an MTV VMA and EMA. She also won Mubeat Global Choice Award – Female at the 11th Gaon Chart Music Awards and Worldwide Fans' Choice Top 10 at the 2021 Mnet Asian Music Awards. Lisa was honored as a cultural ambassador leader by Thailand's Ministry of Culture and inducted into the Asian Hall of Fame as a Cultural Icon in 2023. She earned two more Guinness World Records for the most followed K-pop artist on Instagram in 2023 and the fastest time to reach one million followers on TikTok in 2024, and became the K-pop soloist with the most Guinness World Records in history.

"Rockstar", the lead single of Lisa's debut studio album Alter Ego (2025), received four nominations at the 2024 MTV Video Music Awards and won Best K-Pop, making her the first solo artist to win the award twice. The album's second single, "New Woman" featuring Rosalía, won Best Collaboration at the 2024 MTV Europe Music Awards, where Lisa also won Biggest Fans and received nominations for Best K-Pop and Best Video. The fourth single, "Born Again" featuring Doja Cat and Raye, garnered Lisa her third Best K-Pop win at the 2025 MTV Video Music Awards and tied Lisa as the artist with the most wins in the category. The album track "Dream" won Best Pop at the 2026 MTV Video Music Awards, making Lisa the first K-pop soloist to win the category. For her acting role in the television series The White Lotus, she received nominations for Outstanding Performance by an Ensemble in a Drama Series at the 32nd Actor Awards and Favorite On Screen at the 2025 iHeartRadio Music Awards. Lisa ranked among Gold House's A100 Most Impactful Asians List in 2022 and 2025 and Forbes's Korea Power Celebrity 40 in 2025-2026.

== Awards and nominations ==
Name of the award ceremony, year presented, category, nominee(s) of the award, and the result of the nomination
Award ceremony	Year	Category	Nominee(s)/work(s)	Result	Ref.
Actor Awards	2026	Outstanding Performance by an Ensemble in a Drama Series	The White Lotus	Nominated	
Asia Artist Awards	2023	Popularity Award – Singer (Female)	Lisa	Nominated	
Asia Artist Awards	2024	Popularity Award – Singer (Female)	Lisa	Nominated	
Asia Artist Awards	2025	Popularity Award – Solo (Female)	Lisa	Nominated	
Asia Artist Awards	2026	Popularity Award – Solo (Female)	Lisa	Pending	
Asian Pop Music Awards	2021	Song of the Year (Overseas)	"Lalisa"	Won	
Asian Pop Music Awards	2021	Top 20 Songs of the Year (Overseas)	"Lalisa"	Won	
Asian Pop Music Awards	2021	Top 20 Albums of the Year (Overseas)	Lalisa	Won	
Asian Pop Music Awards	2021	People's Choice Award (Overseas)	Lalisa	9th place	
Asian Pop Music Awards	2021	Best Dance Performance (Overseas)	"Money"	Nominated	
Asian Pop Music Awards	2021	Best Female Artist (Overseas)	Lisa	Nominated	
Asian Pop Music Awards	2021	Record of the Year (Overseas)	"Lalisa"	Nominated	
Asian Pop Music Awards	2024	Top 20 Songs of the Year (Overseas)	"Rockstar"	Won	
Asian Pop Music Awards	2024	People's Choice Award (Overseas)	"Rockstar"	2nd place	
Asian Pop Music Awards	2024	Best Collaboration (Overseas)	"New Woman" (featuring Rosalía)	Nominated	
Asian Pop Music Awards	2024	Song of the Year (Overseas)	"Rockstar"	Nominated	
Asian Pop Music Awards	2025	Top 20 Albums of the Year	Alter Ego	Won	
Asian Pop Music Awards	2025	People's Choice Award	Alter Ego	Nominated	
Asian Pop Music Awards	2025	Best Female Artist	Lisa	Nominated	
Asian Pop Music Awards	2025	Best Music Video	"Dream"	Nominated	
Asian Pop Music Awards	2025	Record of the Year	"Born Again" (featuring Doja Cat and Raye)	Nominated	
Berlin Commercial Festival	2024	Craft: Editing	"Rockstar"	Nominated	
Berlin Commercial Festival	2025	Best Music Video	"When I'm with You" (featuring Tyla)	Nominated	
Berlin Commercial Festival	2025	Craft: Cinematography	"When I'm with You" (featuring Tyla)	Nominated	
Berlin Commercial Festival	2025	Craft: Editing	"When I'm with You" (featuring Tyla)	Nominated	
Berlin Commercial Festival	2025	Craft: Editing	"Fxck Up the World"	Nominated	
Bravo Otto	2022	Best Newcomer	Lisa	Won	
BreakTudo Awards	2024	International Collaboration of the Year	"New Woman" (featuring Rosalía)	Won	
BreakTudo Awards	2024	International Artist on the Rise	Lisa	Nominated	
BreakTudo Awards	2024	International Hit of the Year	"Rockstar"	Nominated	
BreakTudo Awards	2025	Global Artist	Lisa	Nominated	
BreakTudo Awards	2025	International Collaboration of the Year	"Born Again" (featuring Doja Cat and Raye)	Nominated	
BreakTudo Awards	2026	Asian Artist	Lisa	Pending	
BreakTudo Awards	2026	International Music Video	"Dream"	Pending	
Clio Awards	2025	Music Marketing – Music Videos	"Rockstar"	Bronze	
Clio Awards	2026	Music Marketing – Album Launch/Artist Promotion Integrated Campaign	Alter Ego	Bronze	
Creative Circle Awards	2025	Best Music Video – Editing	"New Woman" (featuring Rosalía)	Gold	
D Awards	2025	Best Girl Solo Popularity Award	Lisa	Nominated	
D Awards	2026	Best Girl Solo Popularity Award	Lisa	Nominated	
D Awards	2026	Upick Global Choice (Girl)	Lisa	Nominated	
The Fact Music Awards	2021	Fan N Star Choice Individual	Lisa	Nominated	
Gaon Chart Music Awards	2022	Mubeat Global Choice Award – Female	Lisa	Won	
Hanteo Music Awards	2021	Artist Award – Female Solo	Lisa	Won	
Hanteo Music Awards	2021	Initial Chodong Record Award	Lalisa	Won	
Hanteo Music Awards	2026	Best Popular Artist	Lisa	Nominated	
Hanteo Music Awards	2026	Global Popular Artist – Africa	Lisa	Nominated	
Hanteo Music Awards	2026	Global Popular Artist – Asia	Lisa	Nominated	
Hanteo Music Awards	2026	Global Popular Artist – Europe	Lisa	Nominated	
Hanteo Music Awards	2026	Global Popular Artist – North America	Lisa	Nominated	
Hanteo Music Awards	2026	Global Popular Artist – South America	Lisa	Nominated	
Hanteo Music Awards	2026	Global Popular Artist – Oceania	Lisa	Nominated	
Hollywood Music Video Awards	2025	Best International	"New Woman" (featuring Rosalía)	Won	
Hollywood Music Video Awards	2025	Best Styling	"New Woman" (featuring Rosalía)	Won	
Hollywood Music Video Awards	2025	Music Video of the Year	"New Woman" (featuring Rosalía)	Nominated	
iHeartRadio Music Awards	2025	Best Music Video	"Rockstar"	Nominated	
iHeartRadio Music Awards	2025	K-Pop Artist of the Year	Lisa	Nominated	
iHeartRadio Music Awards	2026	Best Music Video	"Born Again" (featuring Doja Cat and Raye)	Nominated	
iHeartRadio Music Awards	2026	Favorite Debut Album	Alter Ego	Nominated	
iHeartRadio Music Awards	2026	Favorite K-pop Collab	"Born Again" (featuring Doja Cat and Raye)	Nominated	
iHeartRadio Music Awards	2026	Favorite On Screen	The White Lotus	Nominated	
iHeartRadio Music Awards	2026	K-pop Artist of the Year	Lisa	Nominated	
Joox Thailand Music Awards	2020	Social Superstar	Lisa	Nominated	
Joox Thailand Music Awards	2022	Korean Song of the Year	"Money"	Won	
Joox Thailand Music Awards	2022	Korean Song of the Year	"Lalisa"	Nominated	
Joox Thailand Music Awards	2022	International Song of the Year	"SG" (with DJ Snake, Ozuna and Megan Thee Stallion)	Nominated	
K-World Dream Awards	2025	Girl Solo Popularity Award	Lisa	Nominated	
KM Chart Awards (Note: Hosted by KM Chart and KM Chart World and organized by the KMA Organizing Committee and Upick, the KM Chart Awards is an awards ceremony to honor K-pop artists for their contributions to the global music scene over the previous year.)	2026	Best Popular Solo Female Award	Lisa	Nominated	
Korea First Brand Awards (Note: Hosted by the Korea Consumer Brand Committee and the Korea Consumer Forum, the Korea First Brand Awards bases its winners on a nationwide South Korean survey.)	2022	Best Female Solo Singer	Lisa	Nominated	
Korea Grand Music Awards	2025	Best Music Video	"New Woman" (featuring Rosalía)	Nominated	
Korea Grand Music Awards	2025	Fan Favorite Artist (Female)	Lisa	Nominated	
Korea Grand Music Awards	2025	Trend of the Year – K-pop Solo	Lisa	Nominated	
Las Culturistas Culture Awards	2025	Allison Williams Cool Girl Award	Lisa	Nominated	
Mnet Asian Music Awards	2021	Worldwide Fans' Choice Top 10	Lisa	Won	
Mnet Asian Music Awards	2021	Artist of the Year	Lisa	Nominated	
Mnet Asian Music Awards	2021	Best Dance Performance Solo	"Lalisa"	Nominated	
Mnet Asian Music Awards	2021	Best Female Artist	Lisa	Nominated	
Mnet Asian Music Awards	2021	Song of the Year	"Lalisa"	Nominated	
Mnet Asian Music Awards	2021	TikTok Favorite Moment	Lisa	Nominated	
Mnet Asian Music Awards	2021	Worldwide Icon of the Year	Lisa	Nominated	
MTV Europe Music Awards	2021	Best K-Pop	Lisa	Nominated	
MTV Europe Music Awards	2022	Best K-Pop	Lisa	Won	
MTV Europe Music Awards	2024	Best Collaboration	"New Woman" (featuring Rosalía)	Won	
MTV Europe Music Awards	2024	Biggest Fans	Lisa	Won	
MTV Europe Music Awards	2024	Best K-Pop	Lisa	Nominated	
MTV Europe Music Awards	2024	Best Video	"New Woman" (featuring Rosalía)	Nominated	
MTV MIAW Awards	2022	Best Fandom	Lisa	Nominated	
MTV MIAW Awards	2022	Global Hit of the Year	"Money"	Nominated	
MTV MIAW Awards	2022	K-Pop Domination	Lisa	Nominated	
MTV MIAW Awards	2023	K-Pop Domination	Lisa	Nominated	
MTV Video Music Awards	2022	Best K-Pop	"Lalisa"	Won	
MTV Video Music Awards	2024	Best K-Pop	"Rockstar"	Won	
MTV Video Music Awards	2024	Best Art Direction	"Rockstar"	Nominated	
MTV Video Music Awards	2024	Best Choreography	"Rockstar"	Nominated	
MTV Video Music Awards	2024	Best Editing	"Rockstar"	Nominated	
MTV Video Music Awards	2025	Best K-Pop	"Born Again" (featuring Doja Cat and Raye)	Won	
MTV Video Music Awards	2026	Best Pop	"Dream"	Won	
MTV Video Music Awards	2026	Best Cinematography	"Dream"	Nominated	
MTV Video Music Awards	2026	Best Editing	"Dream"	Nominated	
MTV Video Music Awards	2026	Best K-Pop	"Dream"	Nominated	
Myx Music Awards	2024	Global Video of the Year	"Rockstar"	Nominated	
Nickelodeon Kids' Choice Awards	2025	Favorite Female Breakout Artist	Lisa	Nominated	
Premios Lo Nuestro	2023	Crossover Collaboration of the Year	"SG" (with DJ Snake, Ozuna and Megan Thee Stallion)	Nominated	
SEC Awards (Note: The SEC Awards, formerly known as the Séries em Cena Awards, is a Brazilian award show that honors achievements in music, film, television, and internet culture in Brazil and globally.)	2025	Asian Artist of the Year	Lisa	Nominated	
SEC Awards	2025	International Feat of the Year	"New Woman" (featuring Rosalía)	Nominated	
SEC Awards	2025	International Song of the Year	"Rockstar"	Nominated	
SEC Awards	2026	International Female Artist of the Year	Lisa	Won	
SEC Awards	2026	Asian Artist of the Year	Lisa	Nominated	
Seoul Music Awards	2022	Main Award (Bonsang)	Lalisa	Nominated	
Seoul Music Awards	2022	Korean Wave Award	Lisa	Nominated	
Seoul Music Awards	2022	Popularity Award	Lisa	Nominated	
Thailand Master Youth Club	2021	Inspirational Role Model for Youth	Lisa	Won	
UK Music Video Awards	2024	Best Pop Video International	"Rockstar"	Nominated	
Webby Awards	2026	Launch or Drop, Advertising Campaigns	NikeSKIMS Spring '26 Campaign featuring Lisa	Won	
Weibo Starlight Awards	2020	Popular Artist of the Year	Lisa	Won	
Weibo Starlight Awards	2020	Starlight Hall of Fame (Southeast Asia)	Lisa	Won	

== Other accolades ==
=== State and cultural honors ===
Name of country, year given, and name of honour
Country	Year	Honour	Ref.
South Korea (Note: Awarded at the Korean Popular Culture and Arts Awards, organised by the Korea Creative Content Agency and hosted by the South Korean Ministry of Culture, Sports and Tourism. Honors are given to individuals or groups for their contribution to popular culture in South Korea and abroad.)	2026	Okgwan Order of Cultural Merit (4th Class)	
Thailand	2023	Wattanakunathorn Award (Cultural Ambassador Leader)	
United Kingdom	2023	Most Excellent Order of the British Empire (MBE)	

=== Listicles ===
Name of publisher, year listed, name of listicle, and placement
Publisher	Year	Listicle	Placement	Ref.
Asian Hall of Fame	2023	Asian Hall of Fame: Class of 2023 (Note: Honored as a "Cultural Icon".)	Inducted	
Billboard Korea	2024	K-Pop Artist 100	66th	
Billboard Korea	2025	K-Pop Artist 100	88th	
Complex	2026	The 25 Best Dressed K-Pop Stars of All Time, Ranked	5th	
Complex	2026	The Best Dressed Female K-Pop Stars of All Time, Ranked	2nd	
Complex	2026	The 30 Best K-Pop Solo Artists Right Now, Ranked	4th	
Forbes Asia	2025	A Decade of 30 Under 30 Asia: Meet Some of the Most Successful Alumni	Placed	
Forbes Korea	2025	Power Celebrity 40	32nd	
Forbes Korea	2026	Power Celebrity 40	20th	
Gold House (Note: The A100 List honors the most impactful Asians and Asian American & Pacific Islanders (AAPIs) in culture every May for AAPI Heritage Month. Gold House "champions trailblazing members of the AAPI community and their transformative contributions to entertainment, fashion, lifestyle, technology, business, social activism and politics from the past year.")	2022	A100 Most Impactful Asians List	Placed	
Gold House	2025	A100 Most Impactful Asians List	Placed	
The Guardian	2019	Best girl band members of all time	24th	
Madame Tussauds	2025	Hot 100	Placed	
Variety	2025	International Film and TV Breakouts of the Year	Placed	

=== World records ===
Key
†	Indicates a formerly held world record (Note: Note that this does not indicate that Lisa lost the record, only that the listed record holder (i.e. a music video) was eventually surpassed.)

Name of record body, year the record was awarded, name of the record, and the name of the record holder
Publication	Year	World record	Record holder	Ref.
Guinness World Records	2021	† Most viewed YouTube music video by a solo artist in 24 hours (Note: With 73.6 million views on the first day of release, "Lalisa" broke the record held by Ariana Grande's "Thank U, Next" (2018) for the most viewed YouTube video by a solo artist in 24 hours on September 10, 2021. She extended the record on April 13, 2022.)	"Lalisa"	
Guinness World Records	2021	Most viewed YouTube music video in 24 hours by a solo K-pop artist (Note: With 73.6 million views on the first day of release, "Lalisa" broke the record held by bandmate Rosé's "On the Ground" (2021) for the most viewed YouTube video in 24 hours by a solo K-pop artist on September 10, 2021.)	"Lalisa"	
Guinness World Records	2022	Most views of a new music video release from a solo artist in 24 hours on YouTube	"Lalisa"	
Guinness World Records	2022	First solo K-pop winner at the MTV Video Music Awards	Lisa	
Guinness World Records	2022	Fastest solo K-pop artist to reach 1 billion streams on Spotify (female) (Note: On October 26, 2022, Lisa broke the record for the fastest solo K-pop artist to reach 1 billion streams on Spotify in 411 days. The record was broken by Jungkook achieving it in 409 days on March 27, 2023, though Lisa retained the record for the fastest female solo K-pop artist.)	Lisa	
Guinness World Records	2022	First solo K-pop winner at the MTV Europe Music Awards	Lisa	
Guinness World Records	2023	† Most followers on Instagram for a K-pop artist (Note: Lisa achieved the record with 86.3 million followers as of January 19, 2023. She extended the record to 90.7 million followers as of March 24, 2023.)	Lisa	
Guinness World Records	2023	Most followers on Instagram for a K-pop artist	Lisa	
Guinness World Records	2023	First album by a solo K-pop artist to reach 1 billion streams on Spotify	Lalisa	
Guinness World Records	2023	First K-pop track by a solo artist to reach 1 billion streams on Spotify	"Money"	
Guinness World Records	2024	Fastest time to reach one million followers on TikTok (Note: Lisa achieved the record by gaining a million followers in two hours and 18 minutes on June 6, 2024.)	Lisa	

=== Streaming milestones ===
Name of the achievement, year presented, category, and work(s)
Achievement	Year	Category	Work(s)	Ref.
Spotify Billions Club	2023	Billions Club Plaque	"Money"	

== See also ==
- List of awards and nominations received by Blackpink
