= Lalisa =

Lalisa may refer to:

- Lalisa (single album), a 2021 single album by Thai rapper and singer Lisa
- "Lalisa" (song), a 2021 song by Lisa
- "Lalisa", a 2026 song by Glasperlenspiel
- Lalisa Manobal or Lisa (born 1997), Thai rapper and singer

== See also ==
- La Lisa, municipality in Havana, Cuba
