= Kang Soo-jin =

Kang Soo-jin may refer to:

- Kang Sue-jin (born 1967), South Korean ballerina
- Kang Soo-jin (voice actor), South Korean voice actor
- Kang Soo-jin (voice actress), South Korean voice actress
