= List of My Little Old Boy cast members =

My Little Old Boy (a.k.a. Mom's Diary: My Ugly Duckling) is a South Korean television entertainment program, distributed and syndicated by SBS every Sunday at 21:05 (KST).

== Regular members ==
Name	Mother	Episodes	Notes
Lee Sang-min	Im Yeo-soon (Ep 32–63, 69–70)	32–present	Lee Sang-min is the leader of the cast members of the show. He has a debt of about $6 million and he is frugal as a result of it. He lives on his memories during his glory days and often likes to show off. He is a sneaker collector and takes great interest in shoes. It was said in the show that he keeps around 300 pairs of sneakers in his home. He is also friends with most of the sons on the show.
Kim Jong-kook	Cho Hye-seon (Ep 78–287,331)	76–460	He won the Grand Award at the 2020 SBS Entertainment Awards. He loves to exercise and often goes to the gym. His testosterone level is 9.24. Similar to both Kim Hee-chul and Hong Jin-young, Kim Jong-kook also enjoys playing video games. Like Lee Sang-min, he is frugal and does not tolerate people wasting anything. He announced on August 18, on the Running Man set, that he will marry his non-celebrity girlfriend. On September 5, 2025, he married his non-celebrity girlfriend in a private ceremony at J Hotel in Gangnam, Seoul.
Im Won-hee		87–present	Known as "pitiful Won-hee" because of the way he dresses and his red cheeks. He is fond of going to the flea market to buy exotic old toys at high prices, as well as clothing. He is generally calm and he enjoys things that bring old memories. He won the Best Couple Award at the 2020 SBS Entertainment Awards.
Bae Jung-nam		109–231, 406–present	Bae Jung-nam lives alone with his dog named Bell. He takes interest in fashion designing and he hand sews old clothes and creates new designs out of them. He speaks in Busan dialect. He is a fashion model as well as an actor.
Kim Hee-chul (Super Junior)	Kim Sun-ja	153–present	Similar to Hong Jin-young, Kim Hee-chul likes to play video games. He loves watching Chinese martial arts drama series and memorize the dialog of the entire scene. He is extremely neat to the point of avoiding cooking food at his own home.
Dindin	Kim Pan-rye	291-present	
Heo Kyung-hwan	Lee Shin-hee	302-present	
Lee Dong-gun	Seo Young-nam	365-present	
Choi Jin-hyuk	Park Mi-jia (Ep 392–present)	234–265, 293–present	
Han Hye-jin	Yoon Ji-young	367-present	
Kim Seung-soo	Choi In-sook (Ep 369–present)	367-present	
Lee Hong-gi	Gong Seung-ok	442-present	
Jung Gun-joo	Moon Nam-mi	477-present	

=== Former ===
Name	Mother	Episodes	Notes
Kim Je-dong	Park Dong-yeon	Pilot–3	
Heo Ji-woong	Kim Hyun-joo	Pilot–31	He suffers of mysophobia so he spends most of his time cleaning the house and car. He's a figurine lover, especially the Star Wars ones, Darth Vader being his favorite character.
Kim Gun-mo	Lee Sun-mi	Pilot–167	He is a soju lover, bicycle maniac (he owns 7 bicycles) and has a love for printed T-shirts. He has a game addiction. He also has a large collection of drones.
Park Soo-hong	Ji In-sook	1–237	He has andropause and is a club frequenter.
Hong Jin-young & Hong Sun-young	Choi Mal-soon	118–217	Hong Jin-young lives with her older sister Sun-young. Jin-young likes to play video games.
Lee Tae-sung & Sung Yu-bin	Park Young-hye	184–301	Lee Tae-sung lives with his younger brother, singer Sung Yu-bin, and is raising his son Han-seung as a divorced single father. Han-seung splits his time between his father and paternal grandparents' homes.
Park Goon		226–293	Park Goon was a former special forces soldier and is currently a trot singer. He has a good personality. He often hangs out with Lee Sang-min.
Tony An	Lee Ok-jin (Ep 3–183, 274–present)	3–77, 274	Tony is an alcoholic and has a messy image. He often puts off cleaning his house that is designed like a convenience store.

== Special members ==
Name	Episodes	Notes / Ref.
Kim Jong-min	56–57, 273–present	He has a clumsy image and is concerned about his health so he takes a lot of supplements and vitamins.
Tak Jae-hoon	69–present	He is known as the semi-regular cast member of the show. His grumpy and sarcastic jokes are what makes him stand out. He is good friends with Lee Sang-min, Kim Jong-kook and Im Won-hee and often hangs out with them.
Jung Suk-yong	198–present	Jung Suk-yong is Im Won Hee's close friend. They always spend time and travel together, hence winning the Best Couple Award at the 2020 SBS Entertainment Awards.
Kim Jun-ho	213–present	Kim Jun-ho has been divorced for 7 years. He often drinks and has hangovers but doesn't clean up his mess. He is the Vice Chairman of the club made by the cast members.
Choi Si-won (Super Junior)	269-present	
Kim Gun-woo	341-present	
Eun Ji-won	386-present	

=== Former ===
Name	Episodes	Notes / Ref.
Yoon Jung-soo	57	He is a foodie and tries by any means to lose weight.
Yang Se-chan & Yang Se-hyung	72, 74, 98–100	
Sam Okyere	73	
Dok2	79	
Seungri	89–90, 92, 94–95, 97	
Jung Jae-hyung	102–103	
Joo Byung-jin	106–107	
Hong Jin-young	103–104, 113–114	
Jun Jin	137–138	
Eum Moon-suk	173–174	
Kim Hyung-muk	180	
Jang Minho & Young Tak	190–193	
Kim Ho-joong	194–195, 200, 202, 214	
Kim Min-jong	218-219	
Lee Hee Moon	235	
Go Eun-ah	240–243	
Kwak Si-yang	266–285	
Kim Min-kyung	332-338	
Park Sun-young (actress, born 1970)	355, 357	
Go Jun	358	
Woo Sang-hyeok	368	
Na Sun-uk	380	
Im Hyun-sik	382, 387	
Bae Sung-jae	397-398, 401	
Youn Sung-ho	399	
No Min-woo	402	
