= Korean Popular Culture and Arts Awards =

South Korean awards

- Hangul: 대한민국 대중문화예술상
- Hanja: 大韓民國 大衆文化藝術賞
- RR: Daehanminguk daejungmunhwayesulsang
- MR: Taehanmin'guk taejungmunhwayesulsang
- Awarded for: Contributions to pop culture and the arts
- Country: South Korea
- Presented by: Korea Creative Content Agency
- First award: 2010

The Korean Popular Culture and Arts Awards (Korean: 대한민국 대중문화예술상) is an annual South Korean government-run awards ceremony hosted by the Ministry of Culture, Sports and Tourism's Korea Creative Content Agency. The ceremony, which was first held in 2010, "honor[s] those who have made a contribution to contemporary pop culture and the arts, including actors, singers, comedians and models."

== Categories ==
There are four categories of awards:

- Order of Cultural Merit (문화훈장)
- Presidential Commendation (대통령표창)
- Prime Minister's Commendation (국무총리표창)
- Minister of Culture, Sports and Tourism Commendation (문화체육관광부장관표창)

The Order of Cultural Merit is considered to be a higher honor than the commendations.

== Award recipients ==
† - posthumously awarded

=== 2010 – 2019 ===
Year	Order of Cultural Merit	Presidential Commendation	Prime Minister's Commendation	Minister of Culture, Sports and Tourism Commendation
2010	Bogwan (Precious Crown), 3rd Class: Shin Goo (actor); Go Eun-jung (voice actress); Im Hee-chun (comedian)	Shin Se-young (singer) †; Yoon Hyeong-ju (singer); Joo Hyun-mi (singer); Lee Ho-jun (musician)	Jung Hye-sun (actress); Bae Han-seong (voice actor); Min Yeong-mun (animation producer) †; Nam Seong-nam (comedian); Kim Hae-sook (actress); Kim Chun-kwang (musician); Lee Sun-hee (singer)	Jung Joon-ho (actor); Lee Jeong-sik (musician); Won Soo-yeon (cartoonist); Yoon Tae-ho (cartoonist); Super Junior (singers); Song Do-yeong (voice actress); Big Bang (singers); Bae Il-jip (comedian); Maya (singer); Kim Byung-jo (comedian); Kim Mi-sook (actress); Kim Kwang-seok (musician)
2011	Eungwan (Silver Crown), 2nd Class: Ha Chun-hwa (singer); Shin Young-kyun (actor); Lee Soo-man (music producer); Bogwan (Precious Crown), 3rd Class: Shin Jung-hyeon (musician); Oh Seung-ryong (voice actor); Yoo Ho (playwright/screenwriter)	Yang Hyun-suk (music producer); Lee Byung-hun (actor); Do Shin-woo (model); Hong Sang-soo (film director); Kim Gun-mo (singer); Nam Cheol (comedian); J.Y. Park (music producer)	Girls' Generation (singers); Kim Ki-deok (radio DJ); Shim Sung-rak (musician); Jeong Su-ra (singer); Lee Jin-seok (TV producer); Sin Cheol (film producer); Kim Soo-hee (voice actress); Yoo Dong-geun (actor)	ZE:A (singers); Jeon In-hwa (actress); Seo Hye-jeong (voice actress); CNBLUE (singers); Beast (singers); Kim Ki-pyo (musician); Jang Keun-suk (actor); Kim Byung-man (comedian); After School (singers); Lee Kyung-sil (comedian); Le Tae-kyung (record engineer); Song Il-gook (actor)
2012	Eungwan (Silver Crown), 2nd Class: Lee Jung-jin (actor); Jo Min-su (actress); Psy (singer); Song Seung-hwan (actor/producer); Bogwan (Precious Crown), 3rd Class: Na Moon-hee (actress); Song Chang-sik (singer); Kim Ki-duk (filmmaker); Geum Sa-hyang (singer); Yun Il-bong (actor); Gim Su-hyeon (TV writer)	Park Seong-yeon (singer); Yu Gang-jin (voice actor); An Chi-haeng (musician/composer); Lee Yong-shik (comedian); Han Suk-kyu (actor); Sim Jae-myeong (film producer); Kim Chang-wan (singer)	Na Yoon-sun (singer); 2NE1 (singers); Gim Dong-su (model/professor); Ha Jung-woo (actor); Gim Hyeong-seok (songwriter); Cho Seung-woo (actor); Lee Eun-ha (singer); Yoo Jae-suk (comedian)	Shinee (singers); Kim Soo-hyun (actor); Ryu Seung-ryong (actor); Kiha & The Faces (singers); Hong sisters (TV writers); Lee Soo-geun (comedian)
2013	Eungwan (Silver Crown), 2nd Class: Cho Yong-pil (singer); I Hye-gyeong (voice actor); Patti Kim (singer); Ahn Sung-ki (actor); Gim Jeong-su (TV writer); Gu Bong-seo (comedian)	Lee Jung-gil (actor); Jeong Seong-jo (musician); Choe Heon (singer) †; Jeon Je-deok (musician); Sunwoo Yong-nyeo (actress); Ryoo Seung-wan (film director); Song Byeong-jun (TV producer)	Choi Yang-rak (comedian); Bak Il (voice actor); Kim Kap-soo (actor); Bae Su-yeon (musician); Lee Seung-hwan (singer); Kim Mok-gyeong (singer); Kim Ji-seon (comedian); Seo Su-min (TV producer)	Go Eun-gyeong (model); Kim Jun-ho (comedian); Secret (singers); Shin Hyun-joon (actor); Sistar (singers); Eru (singer); Jang Seo-hee (actress)
2014	Eungwan (Silver Crown), 2nd Class: Choi Bool-am (actor); Bak Jeong-ran (TV writer); Song Hae (comedian); Bogwan (Precious Crown), 3rd Class: Choi Eun-hee (actress); Myeong Kook-hwan (singer); Kim Su-il (voice actor)	Kim Kwang-seok (singer) †; I Jae-yeon (model); I Yu-sin (musician); Hong Seung-seong (music producer); Gim Yeong-hui (TV producer); Yoo Young-jin (music producer); Sa Mi-ja (actress)	Jin Mi-ryeong (singer); Lee Min-ho (actor); Jeon Guk-hwan (actor); Kim Soo-hyun (actor); Park Ji-eun (screenwriter); Shin Dong-yup (comedian); Jeong Dae-gyeong (theater producer); Na Young-seok (TV producer)	Lee Seung-gi (singer); Exo (singers); Jeong Jin-seok (choreographer); Kim Bo-sung (actor); Gim Jae-man (musician); Kim Jun-hyun (comedian); Go Geon-hyeok (music producer)
2015	Eungwan (Silver Crown), 2nd Class: Lee Deok-hwa (actor); I Seong-hui (album manufacturer); Nam Seong-nam (comedian) †; Bogwan (Precious Crown), 3rd Class: Nam Il-hae (singer); Norah Noh (fashion designer); I Hui-u (screenwriter)	Jun Ji-hyun (actress); Lee Moon-sae (singer/radio DJ); Lee Yong (singer); I Seon-yeong (voice actress); Gim Gwang-su (model); Jeong Tae-seong (film producer); I Ho-yeon (music producer)	Park Shin-hye (actress); Oh Dal-su (actor); Lee Jong-suk (actor); Choi Jung-won (musical actress); Kim Jong-kook (singer); IU (singer); JYJ (singers); Kim Hak-rae (comedian)	Park Hyun-bin (singer); So Chan-whee (singer); Girl's Day (singers); Jo Yeong-su (songwriter); Bak Yeong-yong (musician); Ongals (comedians); Bae Yun-jeong (choreographer); Bak Yun-hui (make-up artist)
2016	Eungwan (Silver Crown), 2nd Class: Kim Ji-mee (actress); Namkoong Won (actor); Nam Bo-won (comedian); Tae Jin-ah (singer); Bogwan (Precious Crown), 3rd Class: Bae Sang-tae (songwriter); Im Chung (screenwriter)	Kim Eun-sook (screenwriter); BoA (singer); Song Joong-ki (actor); Song Hye-kyo (actress); Eom Yong-su (comedian); I Jeong-seon (musician); Lee Hyun-se (cartoonist)	Gim Baek-su (actor); Shinee (singers); Yoo Ah-in (actor); I Geon-u (lyricist); Lee Kwang-soo (actor); Cho Jin-woong (actor); G-Dragon (singer); Hwang Jung-eum (actress)	Kim Saeng-min (TV presenter); BTS (singers); Son Seong-deuk (choreographer); Ahn Ji-hwan voice actor); Ock Joo-hyun (musical actress); Im Ju-wan (model); Jo Jung-suk (actor); Hwang Chi-yeul (singer); Bak Hui-ju (cinematographer)
2017	Eungwan (Silver Crown), 2nd Class: Nam Jin (singer); Park Geun-hyung (actor); Youn Yuh-jung (actress); Bogwan (Precious Crown), 3rd Class: Gim Ji-seok (movie "programmer"); Lee Kyung-kyu (comedian); I Geum-rim (screenwriter)	Kim Sang-joong (actor); Bunny Girls (singers); Son Hyun-joo (actor); Yang Ji-un (voice actor); Cha Seung-won (actor); Ha Ji-yeong (lyricist); Kim Mi-hwa (comedian)	Ji Sung (actor); Kim Jong-seok (comedian); Sean (singer); Song Hong-seop (musician/composer); I Eung-bok (TV producer); Jang Yu-jin (voice actress); Jang Yoon-jeong (singer); Exo (singers)	Namkoong Min (actor); Ra Mi-ran (actress); Park Bo-gum (actor); Park Bo-young (actress); Lee Sun-jin (model); BtoB (singers); Twice (singers)
2018	Eungwan (Silver Crown), 2nd Class: Kim Min-ki (singer); Lee Soon-jae (actor); Jo Dong-jin (singer) †; Bogwan (Precious Crown), 3rd Class: Kim Young-ok (actress); Gim Ok-yeong (writer); Gim Jeong-taek (composer); Hwagwan (Flower Crown), 5th Class: BTS (singers)	Kim Nam-joo (actress); Gim Dong-su (model); Kim Pyeong-ho (sound engineer) †; Yoo Jae-suk (comedian); Yoon Sang (musician); I Gyeong-ja (voice actress)	Kang San-ae (singer); Gang Hui-seon (voice actress); Kim Sook (comedian); Kim Joo-hyuk (actor) †; Son Ye-jin (actress); Lee Sun-kyun (actor); Jun Hyun-moo (TV presenter); Choi Jin-hee (singer)	Gang Dae-yeong (make-up artist); Guckkasten (singers); Gim Mi-gyeong (musical director); Kim Eana (lyricist); Kim Tae-ri (actress); Red Velvet (singers); Park Na-rae (comedian); I Seon (voice actress)
2019	Eungwan (Silver Crown), 2nd Class: Kim Hye-ja (actress); Yang Hee-eun (singer); Bogwan (Precious Crown), 3rd Class: Gim Hong-tak (guitarist); Gim Un-gyeong (screenwriter); I Tae-hyeon (concert organizer)	Yum Jung-ah (actress); Bae Cheol-soo (radio broadcaster); Bom Yeoreum Gaeul Kyeoul (band); Kim Ki-hyeon (voice actor); Seo Byeong-gu (choreographer); Hong Kyung-pyo (cinematographer)	Kim Wan-sun (singer); Kim Nam-gil (actor); Kim Seo-hyung (actress); Han Ji-min (actress); Song Eun-i (comedian); I Jeong-gu (voice actor); Ham Chun-ho (guitarist); Jo Hyeon-tak (TV producer)	Mamamoo (singers); Monsta X (singers); NCT 127 (singers); Song Ga-in (singer); Ryu Jun-yeol (actor); Lee Hanee (actress); Jung Hae-in (actor); Jin Seon-kyu (actor); Lia Kim (choreographer)

=== 2020 – present ===
Year	Order of Cultural Merit	Presidential Commendation	Prime Minister's Commendation	Minister of Culture, Sports and Tourism Commendation
2020	Eungwan (Silver Crown), 2nd Class: Go Doo-shim (actress); Byun Hee-bong (actor); Yoon Hyang-gi (singer); Bogwan (Precious Crown), 3rd Class: Song Do-soon (voice); Song Ji-na (scriptwriter); Im Ha-ryong (actor/comedian)	Kim Hee-ae (actress); Hyun Bin (actor); Kang Ho-dong (comedian); Kim Ki-pyo (musician); Kim Eun-hee (scriptwriter); Chun Ho-jin (actor)	Gong Hyo-jin (actress); Kang Ha-neul (actor); Park Mi-sun (comedian); Seventeen (singers); Shin Choon-soo (producer); Yoon Yoo-sun (actress); Choi Young-joon (choreographer); Kim Yong-shik (voice actor)	Ryu Soo-young (actor); Jang Do-yeon (comedian); Lim Young-woong (singer); Jung Sung-ha (musician); Jo Jae-yoon (actor); Jung Sung-hwa (actor); No Brain (musician); Lim Sang-choon (scriptwriter); Kang Soo-jin (voice actress)
2021	Geumgwan (Golden Crown), 1st Class: Youn Yuh-jung (actress); Eungwan (Silver Crown), 2nd Class: Lee Jang-hee (singer); Lee Choon-yeon (film director) †; Bogwan (Precious Crown), 3rd Class: Song Jae-ho (actor) †; Park In-hwan (actor); Noh Hee-gyeong (scriptwriter)	Kim Yeong-cheol (actor); Jung Woo-sung (actor); Kim Yeon-ja (singer); Lee Juck (singer); Kim Tae-ho (television director); Park Jae-beom (scriptwriter); Choi Soo-min (voice actress)	Lee Jung-eun (actress); Han Ye-ri (actress); WoongSan (singer); Jung Won-young (jazz musician); Kim Mun-jeong (musical sound director); An Gyeong-jin (voice actor); Kim Seol-jin (artistic director)	NCT Dream (singers); Oh My Girl (singers); Lee Je-hoon (actor); Oh Jung-se (actor); Ahn Young-mi (comedian); Choi Deok-hee (voice actor); Seo Young-do (electric bass musician); Go Sang-ji (bandoneon musician); Sora Choi (fashion model)
2022	Eungwan (Silver Crown), 2nd Class: Park Chan-wook (film director); Kang Soo-yeon (actress) †; Bogwan (Precious Crown), 3rd Class: Huh Young-man (manhwa artist); Park Jin-sook (screenwriter); Song Kang-ho (actor)	Hong Seung-ok (voice actress); Byeon Sung-yong (musician); Kim Yoon-seok (actor); Park Hae-young (screenwriter); Kim Hyun-chul (singer); Bang Jun-seok (music director) †	Lee Sung-min (actor); Jang Pil-soon (singer); Park Myung-soo (comedian); Jaurim (singers); Yeon Sang-ho (director); Kim Ji-yeon (film producer); Zico (singer); Kim Botong (manhwa artist)	Kim Youngsun (voice actor); Kim Sun-young (musical actress); Han Seung-won (producer); Jeon Mi-do (actress); Hong Hyun Hee (comedian); Aiki (choreographer); Paul Kim (singer); Tomorrow X Together (singers); Aespa (singers)
2023	Geumgwan (Gold Crown), 1st Class: Lee Mi-ja (singer); Eungwan (Silver Crown), 2nd Class: Lee Geun-wook (voice actor); Jung Hye-sun (actress); Bogwan (Precious Crown), 3rd Class: Kim Soo-chul (singer); Lee Hwan-kyung (screenwriter); Yang In-ja (lyricist)	Hwang Jung-min (actor); Choi Yang-rak (comedian); Shin Dong-yup (comedian); Yoo In-shik (director); Jeong Seo-kyeong (screenwriter); Choi Yi-cheol (singer); Crying Nut (musicians)	Namkoong Min (actor); Park Eun-bin (actress); 10cm (singers); Stray Kids (singers); Kim Tae-gyun (comedian); Jang Gwang (actor); Go Hyun-jung (sound director); Kim Bo-ram (artistic director)	Yim Si-wan (actor); Joo Hyun-young (actress); Hwang Je-sung (comedian); Ive (singers); The Boyz (singers); MeloMance (singers); Lee Chan-won (singer); Monika (choreographer); 250 (musician); NewJeans (singers)
2024	Eungwan (Silver Crown), 2nd Class: Shin Goo (actor); Kang Boo-ja (actress); Bogwan (Precious Crown), 3rd Class: Kim Chang-wan (singer); Lim Ki-hong (screenwriter); Okgwan (Jewel Crown), 4th Class: Lee Moon-sae (singer); Hwagwan (Flower Crown), 5th Class: Choi Soo-jong (actor)	Kim Mok-kyung (guitarist); Yeom Hye-ran (actress); Jo Jung-suk (actor); Hong Kwang-ho (musical actor); Kim Han-min (film director); Kim Do-hyun (voice actor); Lee Tae-Kyung (sound artist)	Chun Woo-hee (actress); Lee Je-hoon (actor); Choi Jae-rim (musical actor); Chang Kiha (singer); Kim Young-jin (voice actor); Jang Jae-hyun (film director); Kim Sung Soo (music director); Kenzie (songwriter)	Day6 (band); Silica Gel (band); Jannabi (band); Ahn Eun-jin (actress); Cha Eun-woo (actor); Go Min-si (actress); Youn Sung-ho (comedian); Jung Ho-yeon (actress); Yoon Jong-ho (director)
2025	Eungwan (Silver Crown), 2nd Class: Kim Hae-sook (actress); Bogwan (Precious Crown), 3rd Class: Lee Byung-hun (actor); Jung Dong-hwan (actor); Okgwan (Jewel Crown), 4th Class: G-Dragon (singer); Maggie Kang (film director); Bae Han-seong (voice actor); Jeon Yoo-sung (comedian) †	Kim Mi-kyung (actress); Lee Min-ho (actor); Lee Jung-eun (actress); TVXQ (singers); Rosé (singer); Seventeen (singers); Kim Eun-young (voice actress)	Kim Tae-ri (actress); Kim Ji-won (actress); Park Bo-young (actress); Park Hae-joon (actor); Ju Ji-hoon (actor); Ateez (singers); Twice (singers); Choi Hee-sun (guitarist)	Go Youn-jung (actress); Byeon Woo-seok (actor); Ji Chang-wook (actor); Choo Young-woo (actor); Riize (singers); I-dle (singers); Le Sserafim (singers); Zerobaseone (singers); Lee Su-ji (comedian); Bebe (choreographers)
2026	Eungwan (Silver Crown), 2nd Class: Shin Hae-chul (singer) †; Bogwan (Precious Crown), 3rd Class: Park Myung-sung (theatre producer); Park Yeong-nam (voice actress); Shin Kwan-woong (pianist); Yoo Jae-suk (comedian); Han Yeong-ae (singer); Okgwan (Jewel Crown), 4th Class: Blackpink (singers)	Kang Seung-won (music director); Boohwal (rock band); Super Junior (singers); Yoo Hae-jin (actor); Jang Hang-jun (filmmaker); Ryu Seung-ryong (actor); So Ji-sub (actor)	Bae Mi-hyang (PD); Yoo Seung-mok (actor); Yoon Ga-eun (filmmaker); Ejae (songwriter); Kim Go-eun (actress); Oh Jung-se (actor); AKMU (singers)	Kim Shin-young (comedian); Kim Won-hoon (comedian); Leejung (choreographer); Lim Ji-yeon (actress); Jang Won-shik (film producer); Choi Dae-hoon (actor); Park Ji-hoon (actor); Yoon Kyung-ho (actor); Jang Minho (singer); Nmixx (singers); Enhypen (singers)

=== Most awarded ===
The following award recipients have received multiple honors:

Most awarded individuals or groups
Recipient	Total awards	Notes
Yoo Jae-suk	3	
Bae Han-seong	2	
BTS	2	
Choi Yang-rak	2	
Exo	2	
G-Dragon	2	Plus once as part of Big Bang
Jo Jung-suk	2	
Kim Chang-wan	2	
Kim Hae-sook	2	
Kim Soo-hyun	2	
Kim Tae-ri	2	
Lee Byung-hun	2	
Lee Je-hoon	2	
Lee Jung-eun	2	
Lee Min-ho	2	
Lee Moon-sae	2	
Nam Seong-nam	2	
Namkoong Min	2	
Park Bo-young	2	
Oh Jung-se	2	
Ryu Seung-ryong	2	
Seventeen	2	
Shin Dong-yup	2	
Shin Goo	2	
Shinee	2	
Super Junior	2	
Twice	2	
Youn Yuh-jung	2	

== See also ==
- List of Asian television awards
