= Rockstar (Lisa song) =

2024 single by Lisa

Single by Lisa

from the album Alter Ego
- B-side: "Fxck Up the World"
- Released: June 27, 2024
- Studio: Paradise Sound Recording (Los Angeles); Legend Music (Phuket)
- Genre: Hip-hop; hyperpop
- Length: 2:18
- Label: Lloud; RCA
- Songwriters: Lisa; Ryan Tedder; Sam Homaee; Brittany Amaradio; Lucy Healey; James Essien
- Producers: Ryan Tedder; Sam Homaee

Lisa singles chronology
"Money" (2021)	"Rockstar" (2024)	"New Woman" (2024)

Music video
- "Rockstar" on YouTube

"Rockstar" is a song by Thai rapper and singer Lisa. It was released through Lloud and RCA Records on June 27, 2024, as the lead single from her debut studio album, Alter Ego (2025). A hip-hop track with hyperpop beats, it was written by Lisa, Brittany Amaradio, James Essien, Lucy Healey, Ryan Tedder and Sam Homaee while production was handled by the latter two. It marked Lisa's first solo single in three years and her first release since departing from YG Entertainment and Interscope Records as a solo artist in 2023.

Music critics gave "Rockstar" generally positive reviews, praising its production and Lisa’s performance, though some criticized its lyrics. The song was a commercial success and peaked at number four on the Billboard Global 200 and number one on the Global Excl. U.S., marking Lisa's third top-ten hit on both charts and her first number-one hit on the latter. In Thailand, it debuted at number one on Spotify and set a record for the most daily streams of any song in the country. It also topped the charts in Hong Kong and reached the top ten in Indonesia, MENA, the Philippines, Saudi Arabia, Singapore, Taiwan, and Thailand. In the United States, the song became Lisa's third and highest-charting entry on the Billboard Hot 100 at number 70 and was certified gold by the Recording Industry Association of America (RIAA).

An accompanying music video was directed by Henry Schofield and released on Lloud's YouTube channel simultaneously with the single's release. The cyberpunk-themed video pays homage to Thai culture and features various locations in Bangkok including Yaowarat Road, which contributed to a surge in tourist activity in the region. Lisa promoted the single with performances at the MTV Video Music Awards, the Global Citizen Festival, the Victoria's Secret Fashion Show, Amazing Thailand Countdown 2025, the Coachella Valley Music and Arts Festival, and Blackpink's Deadline World Tour. "Rockstar" received four nominations at the former award ceremony and won Best K-Pop, making her the first solo artist to win the award twice.

== Background and release ==
Lisa departed from her label YG Entertainment for solo activities in December 2023 and subsequently established her own artist management company called Lloud in February 2024. Two months later, she signed with RCA Records, who agreed to work in partnership with Lloud, to release solo music. On June 6, 2024, Lisa first teased new solo music by posting a minimalistic graphic on Instagram Stories reading "Coming soon: LISA" with pre-save links for Spotify and Apple Music. Her official website also displayed the teaser, as did her Lloud management page. She also opened a new TikTok account and posted a video of herself dancing paired with a "gritty synth beat" titled "Coming Soon". Lisa posted a second TikTok video a week later of herself posing for photos on the beach in a white baby tee and black miniskirt while an instrumental track titled "Teaser" played over it. On June 18, Lloud officially announced the song's title, "Rockstar", and its release date of June 27 at 8 p.m. ET. The song marked Lisa's first release under Lloud and RCA Records since her departure from YG Entertainment and served as the lead single from her upcoming debut studio album.

== Composition and lyrics ==
"Rockstar" was produced by Ryan Tedder and Sam Homaee and written by Lisa, Brittany Amaradio, James Essien, Lucy Healey, Ryan Tedder, and Sam Homaee. In an interview with Rolling Stone, Lisa expressed that as her first song in several years, she "wanted to find a great sound, create visuals or choreography that was iconic" and sought a "catchy beat, something that would be easy for people to remember, that would identify it as a Lisa song." It has been described to be a hip-hop track characterized by "hyperpop-lite beats" and "cyberpunk psychedelia". It has also been noted to be "reminiscent of early 2000's J-hip-hop with a fusion of modern-day R&B/hip-hop during the bridge". The song features a sample of "New Person, Same Old Mistakes" by Tame Impala.

Lyrically, the song sees Lisa boastfully reaffirming her power as a rockstar, which she defined to Rolling Stone as "a globally known person who has a unique style, someone who is confident and ready to show it to the world." For the song's chorus she raps "Gold teeth sittin' on the dash, she a rockstar / Make your favorite singer wanna rap, baby, la, la / 'Lisa, can you teach me Japanese?' I said, 'Hai hai' / That’s my life life, baby I’m a rockstar," which acknowledges her newfound rockstar aesthetic as well as her 2021 debut single album Lalisa with the reference to her full name. The line about being asked to speak Japanese also shows off her polyglot skills to mimic those unable to speak multiple languages. Critics interpreted the line as a pointed critique of the "typical anglophilic perspective" that views all of Asia as a "racial monolith" and refuses to acknowledge any part beyond East Asia. Lisa includes several direct homages to her native country Thailand, including a namedrop of BKK, the abbreviation for Bangkok's Suvarnabhumi Airport. She later sings the line "They call me catch and kill", seemingly a reference to her group Blackpink's song "Kill This Love" (2019). She also pays tribute to high fashion, rapping "Tight dress, LV sent it / Oh shit, Lisa reppin'" as a shout out to the fashion house Louis Vuitton. In March, she appeared at the brand’s fall/winter 2024 show at Paris and was later revealed in July to be their latest house ambassador.

== Critical reception ==
Professional ratings
Review scores
Source	Rating
IZM	3.5/5 stars
NME	3/5 stars

Puah Ziwei of NME scored "Rockstar" three out of five stars, noting that while the track's "braggadocious" lyrics were "as played out as can be", Lisa's unique magnetism "elevat[ed] it beyond any of her solo work thus far". Praising the hook "Lisa, can you teach me Japanese? I said, 'Hai, hai'", Puah acknowledged the line as "charmingly tongue-in-cheek" in the way it criticizes "those who think Asia is a racial monolith". Writing for Billboard, Eunbo Shim ranked it the fifth-best song of the album and commended it as a "masterclass in confidence, proof that no K-pop act commands attention" like Lisa, who uses a rap flow "so effortless, it silences doubters". Screen Rant pointed to "Rockstar" as a prime example of Lisa's artistry on the album where she "leans into the production and comes out on top of it". Gabriel Saulog of Billboard Philippines praised the song's "addictive bass and innovative sampling" of Tame Impala's "New Person, Same Old Mistakes", which he felt resulted in a "more impressive and polished take" compared to her previous solo songs "Lalisa" and "Money". Similarly, Derrick Tan of Lifestyle Asia lauded the song as a "dance spectacle backed by an addictive bass" while noting the lyrics were not very poetic. Giving it 3.5 out of 5 stars, IZM's Park Soojin criticized the monotony of the song's sound composition but praised "Rockstar" for its charm and synergy when combined with Lisa's performance. Benjamin Lassy of The Daily Campus described "Rockstar" as an "abrasive tour de force in pop egos" lacking in lyrical substance, although he complimented Lisa's "emotive vocal performance" such as in her sarcastic delivery of “Lisa, can you teach me Japanese?" Pitchfork's Joshua Minsoo Kim described the song as the closest on the album to "traditional" K-pop, but felt that the "adventurousness only goes as far as a glossy chorus reminiscent of Tame Impala-produced Travis Scott." Writing for Elle India, Ekta Sinha named "Rockstar" the 10th best K-pop song of the year and Lisa’s best solo effort yet, describing it as an "exuberant tune" similar to her single album Lalisa with an added level of charisma.

== Accolades ==
Awards and nominations for "Rockstar"
Organization	Year	Award	Result	Ref.
Asian Pop Music Awards	2024	Top 20 Songs of the Year (Overseas)	Won	
Asian Pop Music Awards	2024	People's Choice Award (Overseas)	2nd place	
Asian Pop Music Awards	2024	Best Producer (Overseas) (Note: Producers: Ryan Tedder and Sam Homaee)	Nominated	
Asian Pop Music Awards	2024	Song of the Year (Overseas)	Nominated	
Berlin Commercial Festival	2024	Craft: Editing	Nominated	
BreakTudo Awards	2024	International Hit of the Year	Nominated	
Clio Awards	2025	Music Marketing – Music Videos	Bronze	
iHeartRadio Music Awards	2025	Best Music Video	Nominated	
MTV Video Music Awards	2024	Best K-Pop	Won	
MTV Video Music Awards	2024	Best Art Direction	Nominated	
MTV Video Music Awards	2024	Best Choreography	Nominated	
MTV Video Music Awards	2024	Best Editing	Nominated	
Myx Music Awards	2024	Global Video of the Year	Nominated	
UK Music Video Awards	2024	Best Pop Video International	Nominated	

== Commercial performance ==
"Rockstar" debuted at number four on the Billboard Global 200 chart dated July 13, 2024, becoming Lisa's third top-ten hit after her 2021 singles "Lalisa" and "Money". The song also debuted at number one on the Billboard Global Excl. US with 94.2 million streams and 44,000 sold outside the U.S. between June 28 and July 4. It marked her first number-one song on the chart and her third top-ten hit after "Lalisa" and "Money". Lisa became the third member of Blackpink with a solo number-one on the chart, after bandmates Rosé's "On the Ground" (2021) and Jennie's "You & Me" (2023). With this, Blackpink became the only group in history to have three members achieve number-one songs as soloists. The number-one debut of "Rockstar" broke a long streak of Western, English-language acts dominating the Global Excl. U.S. chart. Lisa became not only the first Thai artist but also the first artist not from a primarily English-speaking country to top the chart in 2024. With its 94.2 million streams, the song also broke the record for the most weekly streams for a Global Excl. U.S. hit in 2024 by a non-American artist. The song charted on the Global 200 for 11 weeks and the Global Excl. US for 15 weeks, surpassing "Lalisa" as her second longest-charting song after "Money" on both charts.

In Lisa's home country Thailand, "Rockstar" debuted at number one on Spotify with over 2.57 million streams in a single day, setting a new record for the most daily streams for any album released in the country. It ranked as the tenth-most streamed K-pop song of the year globally on Spotify. In the United States, "Rockstar" debuted at number 70 on the Billboard Hot 100, marking Lisa's highest-charting entry and her third after "Lalisa" and "Money". It later debuted at number 39 on the Billboard Pop Airplay chart dated August 17, 2024, earning her second entry after "Money" and making Lisa the second Blackpink member to enter the chart after Jennie's "One of the Girls" (2023). "Rockstar" peaked at number 37 the following week dated August 24.

== Music video ==
A scene in the music video of Lisa flanked by backup dancers in a cyberpunk-themed setting filmed in Bangkok.

A music video teaser for "Rockstar" was released on June 26, followed by the official music video on June 28, both on Lloud's official YouTube channel. The video was immediately successful, surpassing 10 million views as well as two million likes in just six hours. It accumulated 32.4 million views and 3.4 million likes in the first 24 hours of release, outpacing the 13.1 million views achieved by IU's "Love Wins All" to become the most-viewed video by a K-pop soloist of 2024 in 24 hours. It debuted at number one on YouTube's Global Weekly Chart with 80.5 million views in its debut week and became the biggest opening week on the platform of the year, surpassing the 60.3 million views recorded by Eminem's "Houdini". The video crossed 100 million views in just two weeks after its release.

The music video was directed by Henry Schofield and choreographed by Sean Bankhead. It was filmed in Bangkok as an homage to Lisa’s native Thailand and has references to Thai culture and authentic life in the country. According to Lisa, she "was really happy to have the opportunity to film in my country. I don’t like to show my culture in a forced way, I like it to come naturally, it’s in my blood, so if I have the opportunity to show it to my audience, I will do it." She filmed the music video at various locations in Thailand, including Yaowarat Road in Bangkok's Chinatown and the defunct movie theatre on New Phetchaburi Road. Lisa reportedly paid ฿20,000 (US$540) to each shop owner on Yaowarat Road to close early in order to facilitate the shooting of the music video. The road was closed from 2:00 am to 5:00 am for three consecutive days. Displaying intense choreography, the music video employed a troupe of 100 Thai dancers. Thai transgender influencers Chinnawat Promsri, Bruze Kachi-sarah, and Aëffy were also featured in the video posing in their evening wear.

The music video's aesthetic was described as "cyberpunk grunge", with the neon-lit streets of the Yaowarat district mirroring futuristic visuals typically associated with Japan. It begins with Lisa standing solo in the center of the brightly-lit street while wearing a "criss-cross bra top, star-shaped earrings, and black moto bottoms styled with layers of silver-stud belts." She then switches scenes to a room with orange walls backdropped by dozens of dancers, now wearing a graphic black-and-white halter top with baggy jeans from Dion Lee’s fall 2024 runway show. The video transitions back to the streets of Bangkok for the chorus, where Lisa dances in low-rise bottoms with a star-shaped black bandeau top, with shimmery eye makeup and blue streaks in her hair. For the song's bridge and ending, Lisa debuts a new futuristic look from Dawei Studio and performs high-energy choreography while wearing a "silver foil corset top and matching parachute pants" in a monochrome white room.

=== Plagiarism allegation ===
On July 4, Gabriel Moses, the director of American rapper Travis Scott's music video for "Fein" (2024), shared a screenshot of an anonymous tip via e-mail on his Instagram story accusing Lisa of imitating a scene from "Fein" in her video for "Rockstar". Moses commented "I got love for all my snitches man" and "Giving niggas till end of the month," while also posting the disputed clip. In the scene, the camera swiftly pans over people wearing white hoodies, similar to a scene in "Fein" where the camera quickly pans over children dressed in white. He further elaborated on Twitter on July 6 and claimed that "They [Lisa's team] reached out to my editor to work on this by the way & 'Fein' was the reference. He said no & they did it anyway. Enjoy the rest of your day."

== Live performances ==
On September 11, Lisa made her debut live performance of "Rockstar" at the 2024 MTV Video Music Awards, where she was awarded Best K-Pop for the song. She performed the song as a headliner for the Global Citizen Festival, which took place on September 28. She also performed it as the opener for the Victoria's Secret Fashion Show 2024 on October 15. On New Year's Eve 2024, Lisa performed "Rockstar" as a headliner for the Amazing Thailand Countdown 2025 event. She also performed the song at the Coachella Valley Music and Arts Festival on April 11 and 18, 2025. In 2025, "Rockstar" was later included in Blackpink's Deadline World Tour setlist as a part of Lisa's solo set. Lisa included "Rockstar" on the setlist of her concert residency Viva La Lisa, which ran from November 12 to 29, 2026 in Las Vegas.

== Impact ==
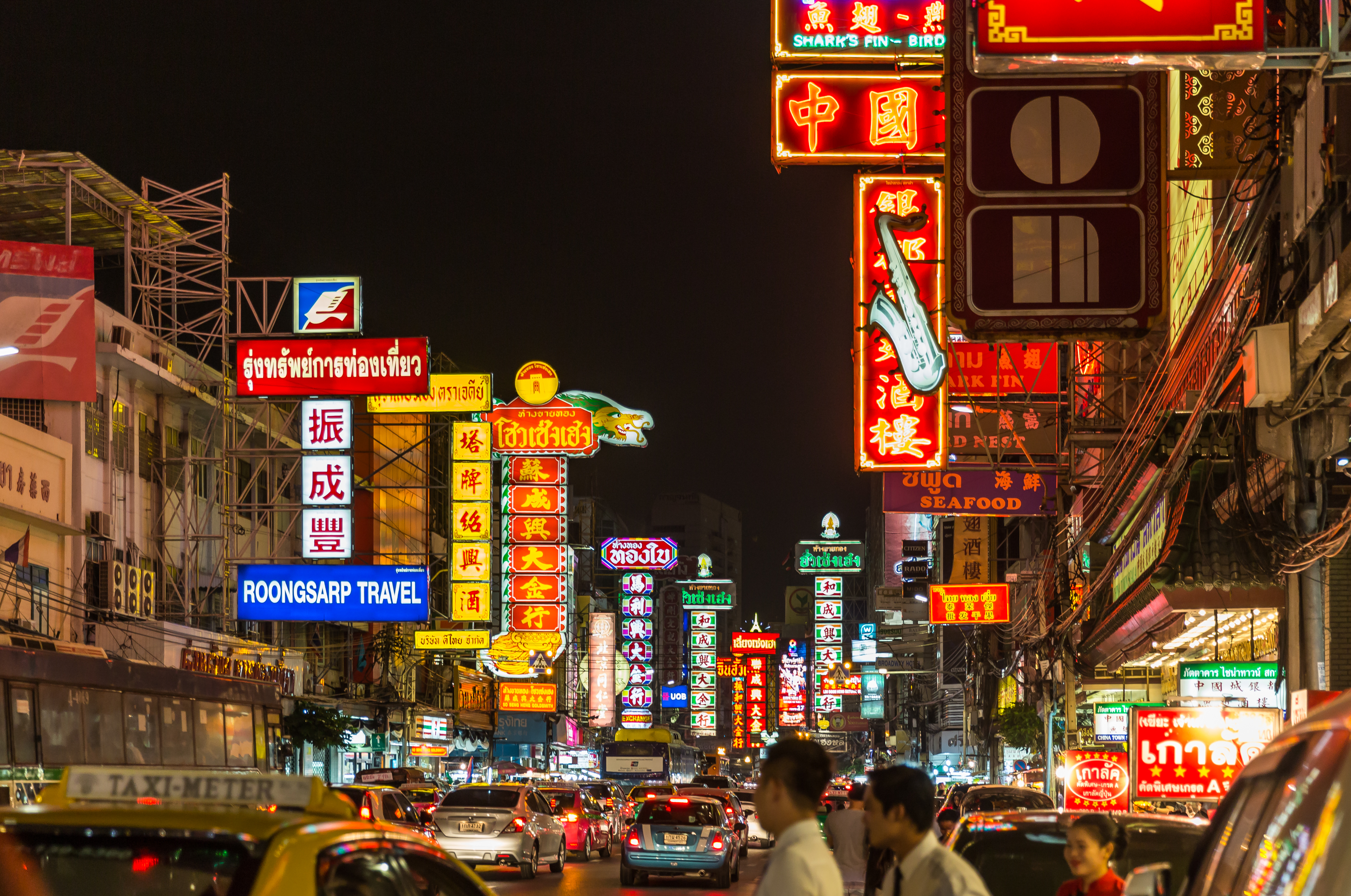
Yaowarat Road, where "Rockstar" was filmed, saw a surge in tourist activity after its release.

Thailand's Prime Minister Srettha Thavisin thanked Lisa for choosing to shoot "Rockstar" in Bangkok's Yaowarat district and expressed confidence that her video would attract tourists to the Chinatown area, stating, "I would like to thank Lisa for thinking of her motherland. Yaowarat Road has high tourism potential, with many Chinese tourists visiting it." The video ultimately did cause a surge in popularity of the area, significantly stimulating the neighborhood's tourism and economy. Prathet Tankuranun, the chief technology officer at True Corporation, reported that the number of mobile users in the area increased by 15% compared to a week before the song was released. The usage of smartphone applications in the district also increased, including 20% for YouTube, 15% for X, and 15% for Line. In response to the surge in visitors, the Bangkok Metropolitan Administration (BMA) and the Ministry of Tourism and Sports worked to enhance safety and infrastructure in Yaowarat and implemented measures such as extending traffic barriers, enhancing waste management, and redirecting traffic. Bangkok governor Chadchart Sittipunt led an inspection visit to assess and improve the locality’s readiness for the growing number of tourists. The Tourism Authority of Thailand (TAT) also revealed plans to capitalize on the opportunity by developing new tourism activities in Yaorawat and nearby neighbourhoods such as Sampheng, Talat Noi, Song Wat, and Wang Burapha.

Music critics argued that "Rockstar" solidified "Lisa's status as an iconic figure in Thailand" through her embracing her image as a Thai singer. By working with local production teams and staff for her music video, she showcased her Thai roots and set a guidepost for other K-pop stars on how to pursue successful solo careers by using authenticity to their advantage. Mary Jane Ainslie, Associate Professor in International Communications at the University of Nottingham, also noted that "Rockstar" was emblematic of a change in the definition of 'Thainess' after a period of rapid economic growth and social change in the country. Instead of previously recognized "global orientalist stereotypes of 'sun, sea and sex'" and "iconography of silks and lotus flowers", the music video and lyrics presented a "neon-grunge aesthetic of nighttime cyberpunk" that Ainslie described as a "pan-Asian noir aesthetic." She asserted that it reflected a growing desire from Thai consumers to seek a vision of "Asian-centric modernity", previously found through following K-pop, in their own culture.

The song stirred a debate about what classifies as K-pop or Thai pop, otherwise known as T-pop. Due to the music video being filmed in Bangkok and featuring many Thai creators, some fans felt that "Rockstar" was more closely associated with T-pop. Kim Jin-woo, head researcher at South Korea's Circle Chart, argued that it could not be classified as a K-pop track and that Lisa was aiming to be a Thai pop star, highlighting Korean streaming service Melon's placement of it in the "pop" category instead of "dance" where the majority of K-pop songs are. However, Lee Gyu-tag, a professor of cultural studies at George Mason University, claimed that "Rockstar" was quite far from being T-pop due to Lisa's globally recognized identity as K-pop idol, and stressed that K-pop is not about the nationalities of the singers but rather other factors such as business models, emphasis on music videos, and parasocial relationships with fans. He also pointed to the song's lack of elements of Thai music as a hip-hop track sung in English. Some Korean music critics analyzed Lisa's work as a successful example of the "localizing" strategy that many K-pop companies are pursuing, maintaining the K-pop style while appealing to the mainstream international audience. Her release of sped-up and slowed-down versions of "Rockstar" was also seen as keeping with international musical trends, making it easier for DJs to use them in remixes at clubs and parties.

== Track listing ==
- Digital download and streaming
1. "Rockstar" – 2:18
2. "Rockstar" (extended) – 2:44
3. "Rockstar" (instrumental) – 2:13
4. "Rockstar" (sped up) – 1:50
5. "Rockstar" (slowed down) – 2:40
- CD single
1. "Rockstar" – 2:18
2. "Rockstar" (extended) – 2:44
3. "Rockstar" (instrumental) – 2:13

4-inch vinyl

1. "Rockstar" – 2:18
2. "Fxck Up the World" – 3:04

== Credits and personnel ==
Credits adapted from CD liner notes.

Recording

- Recorded at Paradise Sound Recording (Los Angeles, California) and Legend Music Studio (Phuket, Thailand)
- Mixed at MixStar Studios (Virginia Beach, Virginia)
- Mastered at Sterling Sound (New York City)

Personnel

- Lisa – vocals, songwriter
- Ryan Tedder – songwriter, producer
- Sam Homaee – songwriter, producer
- Brittany Amaradio – songwriter
- Lucy Healey – songwriter
- James Essien – songwriter
- Kuk Harrell – vocal producer
- Jelli Dorman – vocal engineer
- Serban Ghenea – mix engineer
- Bryce Bordone – assistant mix engineer
- Randy Merrill – mastering engineer

== Charts ==
=== Weekly charts ===
Weekly chart performance
Chart (2024–2026)	Peak position
Argentina Anglo Airplay (Monitor Latino)	11
Australia (ARIA)	61
Bolivia Anglo Airplay (Monitor Latino)	5
Brazil Hot 100 (Billboard)	60
Canada Hot 100 (Billboard)	51
Central America Anglo Airplay (Monitor Latino)	14
Chile Anglo Airplay (Monitor Latino)	13
China (TME Korean)	12
Costa Rica Anglo Airplay (Monitor Latino)	10
Dominican Republic Anglo Airplay (Monitor Latino)	9
Ecuador Anglo Airplay (Monitor Latino)	3
El Salvador Anglo Airplay (Monitor Latino)	11
France (SNEP)	90
Germany Download (GfK)	30
Global 200 (Billboard)	4
Guatemala Anglo Airplay (Monitor Latino)	2
Hong Kong (Billboard)	1
India International (IMI)	13
Indonesia (ASIRI)	11
Ireland (IRMA)	94
Israel (Mako Hitlist)	85
Japan (Japan Hot 100)	74
Lithuania (AGATA)	82
Malaysia International (RIM)	2
MENA (IFPI)	10
Netherlands (Single Tip)	25
Netherlands (Global Top 40)	3
New Zealand Hot Singles (RMNZ)	3
Nicaragua Anglo Airplay (Monitor Latino)	10
Panama Anglo Airplay (Monitor Latino)	8
Paraguay Anglo Airplay (Monitor Latino)	7
Philippines (Philippines Hot 100)	8
Portugal (AFP)	87
Saudi Arabia (IFPI)	7
Singapore (RIAS)	4
South Korea (Circle)	120
Taiwan (Billboard)	2
Thailand (Billboard)	7
United Arab Emirates (IFPI)	13
UK Singles (Official Charts)	49
Uruguay Anglo Airplay (Monitor Latino)	7
US Billboard Hot 100	70
US Hot Rap Songs (Billboard)	19
US Pop Airplay (Billboard)	37

=== Monthly charts ===
Monthly chart performance
Chart (2024)	Position
South Korea (Circle)	154

=== Year-end charts ===
Year-end chart performance
Chart (2024)	Position
Global Excl. US (Billboard)	185

== Certifications ==
Certifications
Region	Certification	Certified units/sales
Brazil (Pro-Música Brasil)	Diamond	160,000^{‡}
Canada (Music Canada)	Gold	40,000^{‡}
Mexico (AMPROFON)	Platinum	140,000^{‡}
United States (RIAA)	Gold	500,000^{‡}
^{‡} Sales+streaming figures based on certification alone.

== Release history ==
Release dates and formats
Region	Date	Format	Version	Label	Ref.
Various	June 27, 2024	Digital download; streaming	Original; extended; instrumental; sped up; slowed down	Lloud; RCA	
United States	July 2, 2024	Contemporary hit radio	Original	Lloud; RCA	
Italy	July 5, 2024	Radio airplay	Original	Sony Italy	
Various	August 7, 2024	CD single	Original; extended; instrumental	Lloud; RCA	
United States	July 17, 2026	4-inch vinyl	Original	Lloud; RCA	

== See also ==
- List of Billboard Global 200 top-ten singles in 2024
- List of Billboard Global Excl. U.S. number ones of 2024
- List of K-pop songs on the Billboard charts
- List of number-one songs of 2024 (Hong Kong)
- List of number-one songs of 2024 (Malaysia)
