= Do-yeong =

- Hangul: 도영
- RR: Doyeong
- MR: Toyŏng

Do-yeong, Do-young, or Do-yong, is a Korean given name.

People with this name include:

- Chang Do-yong (1923–2012), South Korean politician
- Park Do-yeong (born 1993), South Korean speed skater
- Seo Do-young (born 1981), South Korean actor
- Song Do-yeong (born 1951), South Korean voice actress
- Yoon Do-young (born 2006), South Korean football player
- Doyoung (born Kim Dong-young, 1996), South Korean singer, member of boy band NCT
- Kang Full (born Kang Do-young, 1974), South Korean webtoon artist

== See also ==
- List of Korean given names
