= List of Billboard Global 200 top-ten singles in 2021 =

This is a list of singles that charted in the top ten of the Billboard Global 200, an all-genre singles chart, in 2021.

== Top-ten singles ==
Key

- ↑ – indicates single's top 10 entry was also its Global 200 debut
- † – indicates Best performing song of the year
- (#) – 2021 Year-end top 10 single position and rank

List of Billboard Global 200 top ten singles that peaked in 2021
Top ten entry date	Single	Artist(s)	Peak	Peak date	Weeks in top ten	Ref.
Singles from 2020
September 19	"Blinding Lights"^{[B]} (#3)	The Weeknd	2	January 23	26	
November 14	"34+35"^{[C]}^{[D]} ↑	Ariana Grande^{1}	2	January 30	8	
Singles from 2021
January 9	"Bichota"	Karol G	7	January 16	3	
January 16	"Anyone" ↑	Justin Bieber	3	January 16	3	
January 16	"Levitating"^{[F]}^{[G]} † (#1)	Dua Lipa featuring DaBaby^{3}	2	May 29	32	
January 16	"Whoopty"^{[E]}	CJ	10	January 16	2	
January 23	"Drivers License"^{[I]} ↑ (#4)	Olivia Rodrigo	1	January 23	14	
January 23	"Good Days"	SZA	7	February 6	4	
January 30	"Save Your Tears" (#2)	The Weeknd and Ariana Grande^{2}	1	May 8	35	
February 13	"Streets"	Doja Cat	8	February 13	2	
February 20	"Up" ↑	Cardi B	4	February 20	8	
February 27	"Calling My Phone" ↑	Lil Tjay featuring 6lack	2	February 27	3	
February 27	"Love Story (Taylor's Version)" ↑	Taylor Swift	7	February 27	1	
March 13	"Astronaut in the Ocean"	Masked Wolf	3	April 10	12	
March 20	"What's Next" ↑	Drake	1	March 20	2	
March 20	"Wants and Needs" ↑	Drake featuring Lil Baby	2	March 20	1	
March 20	"Leave the Door Open" ↑	Silk Sonic (Bruno Mars and Anderson .Paak)	2	March 27	10	
March 20	"Lemon Pepper Freestyle" ↑	Drake featuring Rick Ross	4	March 20	1	
March 20	"Hold On"^{[H]} ↑	Justin Bieber	4	April 3	3	
March 27	"On the Ground" ↑	Rosé	1	March 27	1	
April 3	"Peaches" ↑	Justin Bieber featuring Daniel Caesar and Giveon	1	April 3	13	
April 3	"Telepatia"	Kali Uchis	10	April 3	1	
April 10	"Montero (Call Me by Your Name)"^{[M]} ↑ (#7)	Lil Nas X	1	April 17	18	
April 17	"Film Out" ↑	BTS	5	April 17	1	
April 17	"Deja Vu"^{[I]} ↑	Olivia Rodrigo	3	June 5	8	
April 24	"Rapstar" ↑	Polo G	3	April 24	5	
April 24	"Kiss Me More" ↑	Doja Cat featuring SZA	3	May 29	18	
April 24	"Heartbreak Anniversary"	Giveon	10	April 24	2	
May 8	"Botella Tras Botella" ↑	Gera MX and Christian Nodal	9	May 8	1	
May 15	"Your Power" ↑	Billie Eilish	6	May 15	2	
May 15	"Without You"	The Kid Laroi^{4}	10	May 15	1	
May 22	"Interlude" ↑	J. Cole	8	May 22	1	
May 29	"Good 4 U" ↑ (#9)	Olivia Rodrigo	1	May 29	18	
May 29	"My Life" ↑	J. Cole, 21 Savage and Morray	4	May 29	1	
May 29	"Amari" ↑	J. Cole	8	May 29	1	
May 29	"Pride Is the Devil" ↑	J. Cole and Lil Baby	9	May 29	1	
June 5	"Butter"^{[K]} ↑	BTS^{5}	1	June 5	11	
June 5	"Traitor" ↑	Olivia Rodrigo	7	June 5	2	
June 12	"Todo de Ti"	Rauw Alejandro	3	June 12	6	
June 19	"Yonaguni"^{[J]} ↑	Bad Bunny	3	June 19	4	
July 10	"Bad Habits" ↑	Ed Sheeran	1	July 31	30	
July 10	"Beggin'"	Maneskin	3	July 17	10	
July 10	"AM"	Nio Garcia, J Balvin and Bad Bunny	10	July 10	1	
July 24	"Permission to Dance" ↑	BTS	1	July 24	4	
July 24	"Stay" ↑ (#8)	The Kid Laroi and Justin Bieber	1	August 7	43	
August 7	"Industry Baby"^{[L]} ↑	Lil Nas X and Jack Harlow	2	October 2	22	
August 14	"Happier Than Ever"^{[N]} ↑	Billie Eilish	6	August 14	6	
August 21	"Take My Breath" ↑	The Weeknd^{6}	5	August 21	2	
August 28	"Pepas"^{[M]}^{[O]}	Farruko	7	September 4	10	
August 28	"Need to Know"	Doja Cat	6	September 4	2	
September 11	"Hurricane" ↑	Kanye West	5	September 11	1	
September 11	"Jail" ↑	Kanye West	6	September 11	1	
September 11	"Off the Grid" ↑	Kanye West	7	September 11	1	
September 18	"Way 2 Sexy" ↑	Drake featuring Future and Young Thug	2	September 18	4	
September 18	"Girls Want Girls" ↑	Drake featuring Lil Baby	3	September 18	2	
September 18	"Fair Trade" ↑	Drake featuring Travis Scott	4	September 18	2	
September 18	"Champagne Poetry" ↑	Drake	5	September 18	1	
September 18	"Knife Talk" ↑	Drake featuring 21 Savage and Project Pat	6	September 18	2	
September 18	"Papi's Home" ↑	Drake	8	September 18	1	
September 18	"In the Bible" ↑	Drake featuring Lil Durk and Giveon	9	September 18	1	
September 18	"Love All" ↑	Drake featuring Jay-Z	10	September 18	1	
September 25	"Lalisa" ↑	Lisa	2	September 25	1	
September 25	"Shivers" ↑	Ed Sheeran	3	November 13	31	
October 2	"Thats What I Want" ↑	Lil Nas X	4	October 2	1	
October 2	"Love Nwantiti (Ah Ah Ah)"	CKay	2	October 16	11	
October 9	"My Universe" ↑	Coldplay and BTS	1	October 9	6	
October 23	"Money"	Lisa	10	October 23	1	
October 30	"Easy on Me"	Adele	1	October 30	20	
November 6	"Moth to a Flame" ↑	Swedish House Mafia and The Weeknd	10	November 6	1	
November 20	"One Right Now" ↑	Post Malone and The Weeknd	9	November 20	1	
November 20	"Escape Plan" ↑	Travis Scott	10	November 20	1	
November 27	"All Too Well (Taylor's Version)" ↑	Taylor Swift	1	November 27	3	
November 27	"Smokin Out the Window"	Silk Sonic (Bruno Mars and Anderson .Paak)	8	November 27	1	
December 4	"Oh My God" ↑	Adele	3	December 4	1	
December 4	"I Drink Wine" ↑	Adele	10	December 4	1	

=== 2020 peaks ===
List of Billboard Global 200 top ten singles in 2021 that peaked in 2020
Top ten entry date	Single	Artist(s)	Peak	Peak date	Weeks in top ten	Ref.
September 19	"Dynamite"^{[B]}^{[G]} (#5)	BTS	1	October 3	26	
September 19	"Mood"^{[B]} (#10)	24kGoldn featuring Iann Dior	2	October 24	25	
November 7	"Positions"^{[B]} ↑	Ariana Grande	1	November 7	10	
November 14	"Dakiti" ↑ (#6)	Bad Bunny and Jhay Cortez	1	November 21	18	

=== 2022 peaks ===
List of Billboard Global 200 top ten singles in 2021 that peaked in 2022
Top ten entry date	Single	Artist(s)	Peak	Peak date	Weeks in top ten	Ref.
September 25	"Heat Waves"	Glass Animals	1	March 5	32	
October 16	"Cold Heart (Pnau Remix)"	Elton John and Dua Lipa	3	January 15	29	
December 11	"abcdefu"	Gayle	1	January 15	22	

=== Holiday season ===
Holiday titles first making the Billboard Global 200 top ten during the 2020–21 holiday season
Top ten entry date	Single	Artist(s)	Peak	Peak date	Weeks in top ten	Ref.
December 12, 2020	"All I Want for Christmas Is You"^{[P]}	Mariah Carey	1	December 19, 2020	33	
December 12, 2020	"Last Christmas"^{[P]}	Wham!	1	December 20, 2025	30	
December 12, 2020	"Rockin' Around the Christmas Tree"^{[Q]}	Brenda Lee	2	December 24, 2022	27	
December 19, 2020	"Jingle Bell Rock"^{[Q]}	Bobby Helms	4	January 2, 2021	26	
December 19, 2020	"It's Beginning to Look a Lot Like Christmas"^{[A]}	Michael Buble	6	January 2, 2021	14	
December 26, 2020	"Santa Tell Me"^{[R]}	Ariana Grande	5	January 2, 2021	20	
January 2, 2021	"It's the Most Wonderful Time of the Year"	Andy Williams	7	January 2, 2021	11	
January 2, 2021	"Underneath the Tree"	Kelly Clarkson	8	January 2, 2021	11	
January 2, 2021	"Feliz Navidad"	Jose Feliciano	5	January 7, 2023	7	

== Notes ==
^{1} A remix of Ariana Grande's "34+35" that features Doja Cat and Megan Thee Stallion helped to bring the song back into the top ten, to its peak position of number 2, on January 30, 2021, and all three artists were credited on the song that week. As of the February 6, 2021 chart, Grande returned to being the only artist credited.
^{2} Ariana Grande is credited on a remix of The Weeknd's "Save Your Tears", with her name appearing on the song beginning with the Global 200 chart dated May 8, 2021. Prior to that week, The Weeknd was the sole artist credit.
^{3} In August 2021, with Dua Lipa's "Levitating" having already been in the top ten for more than 30 weeks, DaBaby was no longer listed as a featured artist on the song. His name is being retained on the entry as he was credited for a majority of the song's run in the top ten, including the week it peaked at number two.
^{4} A remix of The Kid Laroi's "Without You" that features Miley Cyrus helped to bring the song into the top 10 at its peak position of number 10 on May 15, 2021, and Miley Cyrus was credited on the song that week.
^{5} A remix of BTS's "Butter" that features Megan Thee Stallion helped to bring the song back into the top 10 at number 3 on September 11, 2021, and Megan Thee Stallion was credited on the song that week.
^{6} The Weeknd's "Take My Breath" re-entered the top ten on January 22, 2022 upon the release of its parent album Dawn FM. The Dawn FM album version of "Take My Breath" is an extended version of the song.

^{A} The single re-entered the top ten on the week ending January 2, 2021.
^{B} The single re-entered the top ten on the week ending January 9, 2021.
^{C} The single re-entered the top ten on the week ending January 16, 2021.
^{D} The single re-entered the top ten on the week ending January 30, 2021.
^{E} The single re-entered the top ten on the week ending February 6, 2021.
^{F} The single re-entered the top ten on the week ending March 6, 2021.
^{G} The single re-entered the top ten on the week ending March 27, 2021.
^{H} The single re-entered the top ten on the week ending April 3, 2021.
^{I} The single re-entered the top ten on the week ending June 5, 2021.
^{J} The single re-entered the top ten on the week ending July 17, 2021.
^{K} The single re-entered the top ten on the week ending September 11, 2021.
^{L} The single re-entered the top ten on the week ending September 25, 2021.
^{M} The single re-entered the top ten on the week ending October 2, 2021.
^{N} The single re-entered the top ten on the week ending October 9, 2021.
^{O} The single re-entered the top ten on the week ending November 13, 2021.
^{P} The single re-entered the top ten on the week ending December 11, 2021.
^{Q} The single re-entered the top ten on the week ending December 18, 2021.
^{R} The single re-entered the top ten on the week ending December 25, 2021.
