= MTV Europe Music Award for Best K-Pop =

Music award

- Awarded for: K-pop music artists
- Country: Europe
- Presented by: MTV
- First award: 2021
- Final award: 2024
- Currently held by: Jimin (2024)

Highlights
- Most wins: BTS, Lisa, Jungkook, Jimin (1)
- Most nominations: Lisa (3)
- Website: ema.mtv.tv

The MTV Europe Music Award for Best K-Pop is an award category at the MTV Europe Music Awards that was first presented in 2021. It is one of the current Asian categories of the ceremony along with Best Asian Act and the former category Best Korean Act, though it is the first to reward artist(s) of K-pop music as a musical genre, and not as a nationality. Lisa is the most nominated artist in this category, with three nominations.

== Winners and nominees ==
Winners are listed first and highlighted in bold.

† indicates an MTV Video Music Award for Best K-Pop Video–winning artist that same year.
‡ indicates an MTV Video Music Award for Best K-Pop Video–nominated artist that same year.

=== 2020s ===
| Year | Artist | Ref. |
|---|---|---|
| 2021 | **BTS †** | |
| 2021 | gowon | |
| 2021 | f5ve ‡ | |
| 2021 | loona | |
| 2021 | Rosé | |
| 2021 | Twice ‡ | |
| 2022 | **Lisa †** | |
| 2022 | Blackpink | |
| 2022 | BTS ‡ | |
| 2022 | Itzy ‡ | |
| 2022 | Seventeen ‡ | |
| 2022 | Twice ‡ | |
| 2023 | **Jungkook** | |
| 2023 | Fifty Fifty ‡ | |
| 2023 | NewJeans | |
| 2023 | Seventeen ‡ | |
| 2023 | Stray Kids † | |
| 2023 | Tomorrow X Together ‡ | |
| 2024 | **Jimin** | |
| 2024 | Jungkook ‡ | |
| 2024 | Le Sserafim | |
| 2024 | Lisa † | |
| 2024 | NewJeans ‡ | |
| 2024 | Stray Kids ‡ | |

== Statistics ==
=== Artists with multiple nominations ===
3 nominations

- Lisa

2 nominations

- BTS
- Twice
- Seventeen
- Jungkook
- NewJeans
- Stray Kids

== See also ==
- MTV Video Music Award for Best K-Pop
- MTV Europe Music Award for Best Asian Act
- MTV Europe Music Award for Best Korean Act
