= Song Do-yeong =

South Korean voice actress (born 1951)

- 송도영
- Song in 2017
- Born: December 22, 1951 (age 74); Changwon, South Korea

Song Do-yeong (Korean: 송도영; born December 22, 1951) is a South Korean voice actress who joined the Munhwa Broadcasting Corporation's Voice Acting Division in 1970. She was born in Changwon, South Korea.

== Roles ==
=== Broadcast TV ===
- 24 (replacing Leslie Hope by Season 1, Korea TV Edition, MBC)
- Alfred J. Kwak (Korea TV Edition, SBS)
- Buffy the Vampire Slayer (replacing Sarah Michelle Gellar, Korea TV Edition, MBC)
- Candy Candy (Korea TV Edition, MBC) - Eliza Leagan, Annie Brighton
- Future GPX Cyber Formula (Korea TV Edition, SBS) - Asuka Sugo
- Galaxy Express 999 (Korea TV Edition, MBC) - Maetel
- Hamtaro (Korea TV Edition, SBS) - Panda, Kana Iwata
- Juuni Senshi Bakuretsu Eto Ranger (Korea TV Edition, KBS) - Tart, Nyanma
- Naruto (Korea TV Edition, Tooniverse) - Tsunade
- Paul's Miraculous Adventure (Korea TV Edition, SBS) - Nina
- Sally the Witch (Korea TV Edition, Tooniverse) - Sally Yumeno
- Slam Dunk (Korea TV Edition, SBS) - Haruko Akagi
- The Brave Express Might Gaine (Korea TV Edition, KBS) - Sally Yoshinaga
- Tiny Toon Adventures (Korea TV Edition, MBC) - Babs Bunny

=== Film dubbing ===
Morty --> from Rick and morty

- Meg Ryan
  - Top Gun (Carole Bradshaw, Korea TV Edition, SBS)
  - Innerspace (Lydia Maxwell, Korea TV Edition, MBC)
  - When Harry Met Sally... (Sally Albright, Korea TV Edition, MBC)
  - Sleepless in Seattle (Annie Reed, Korea TV Edition, KBS)
  - Courage Under Fire (Captain Karen Emma Walden, Korea TV Edition, KBS)
  - City of Angels (Dr. Maggie Rice, Korea TV Edition, KBS)
  - You've Got Mail (Kathleen Kelly, Korea TV Edition, KBS)
  - Hanging Up (Eve Mozell Marks, Korea TV Edition, KBS)
- Kim Basinger
  - Blind Date (Nadia Gates, Korea TV Edition, SBS)
  - Batman (Vicki Vale, Korea TV Edition, KBS, SBC)
  - Final Analysis (Heather Evans, Korea TV Edition, SBS)
  - Cool World (Holli Would, Korea TV Edition, SBS)
  - The Getaway (Carol McCoy, Korea TV Edition, KBS)
  - L.A. Confidential (Lynn Bracken, Korea TV Edition, KBS)
- Nicole Kidman
  - Days of Thunder (Dr. Claire Lewicki, Korea TV Edition, MBC)
  - The Peacemaker (Dr. Julia Kelly, Korea TV Edition, MBC, SBS)
  - The Hours (Virginia Woolf, Korea TV Edition, MBC)
  - The Human Stain (Faunia Farley, Korea TV Edition, KBS)
  - Cold Mountain (Ada Monroe, Korea TV Edition, MBC)
  - Birth (Anna, Korea TV Edition, MBC)
- Helen Hunt
  - Twister (Dr. Jo Harding, Korea TV Edition, KBS)
  - As Good as It Gets (Carol Connelly, Korea TV Edition, KBS)
  - Dr. T & the Women (Bree Davis, Korea TV Edition, KBS)
  - Pay It Forward (Arlene McKinney, Korea TV Edition, SBS)
  - Cast Away (Kelly Frears, Korea TV Edition, KBS)
- Sophie Marceau
  - La Boum (Vic Beretton, Korea TV Edition, SBS)
  - La Boum 2 (Vic Beretton, Korea TV Edition, SBS)
  - Braveheart (Princess Isabella of France, Korea TV Edition, KBS)
  - The World Is Not Enough (Elektra King, Korea TV Edition, MBC)
  - Anthony Zimmer (Chiara Manzoni, Korea TV Edition, KBS)
- Demi Moore
  - St. Elmo's Fire (Jules Van Patten, Korea TV Edition, SBS)
  - The Seventh Sign (Abby Quinn, Korea TV Edition, KBS)
  - Ghost (Molly Jensen, Korea TV Edition, SBS, KBS)
  - A Few Good Men (Lieutenant Commander JoAnne Galloway, Korea TV Edition, KBS)
  - Disclosure (Meredith Johnson, Korea TV Edition, KBS)
- Jodie Foster
  - The Silence of the Lambs (Clarice Starling, Korea TV Edition, KBS)
  - Sommersby (Laurel Sommersby, Korea TV Edition, KBS, MBC)
  - Maverick (Annabelle Bransford, Korea TV Edition, KBS)
  - Panic Room (Meg Altman, Korea TV Edition, KBS)
- Ellen Barkin
  - Johnny Handsome (Sunny Boyd, Korea TV Edition, SBS)
  - Switch (Amanda Brooks, Korea TV Edition, KBS)
  - The Fan (Jewel Stern, Korea TV Edition, KBS, MBC)
- Bobby (Korea TV Edition, MBC)
- Bram Stoker's Dracula (replacing Winona Ryder, Korean TV Edition, MBC)
- Double Jeopardy (replacing Ashley Judd, Korea TV Edition, MBC)
- Forces of Nature (replacing Sandra Bullock, Korea TV Edition, SBS)
- Gone with the Wind (replacing Vivien Leigh, Korea TV Edition, KBS, SBC)
- Groundhog Day (replacing Andie MacDowell, Korea TV Edition, KBS)
- Outbreak (replacing Rene Russo, Korea TV Edition, SBS)
- Racing Stripes (replacing Hayden Panettiere, Korea TV Edition, SBS)
- Silverhawk (Fei ying, replacing Michelle Yeoh, Korea TV Edition, MBC)
- The Barber of Siberia (replacing Julia Ormond, Korea TV Edition, MBC)
- The Conspirator (replacing Robin Wright, Korea TV Edition, KBS)
- The Devil's Own (replacing Natascha McElhone, Korea TV Edition, SBS)
- The King's Speech (replacing Jennifer Ehle, Korea TV Edition, KBS)
- The Last of the Mohicans (replacing Madeleine Stowe, Korea TV Edition, MBC)
- The Mummy (replacing Rachel Weisz, Korea TV edition, MBC)
- The Queen (replacing Helen Mirren, Korea TV Edition, MBC)
- The Robe (replacing Jean Simmons, Korea TV Edition, MBC)
- The Shipping News (replacing Julianne Moore, Korea TV Edition, SBS)
- The Siege (replacing Annette Bening, Korea TV Edition, MBC)
- Top Gun (replacing Kelly McGillis, Korea TV Edition, KBS)
- True Lies (replacing Jamie Lee Curtis, Korea TV Edition, MBC)
- Waterworld (replacing Jeanne Tripplehorn, Korea TV Edition, SBS)

== Awards ==
=== State honors ===
Name of country, year given, and name of honor
Country	Year	Honor	Ref.
South Korea (Note: Honors are given at the Korean Popular Culture and Arts Awards, arranged by the Korea Creative Content Agency and hosted by the Ministry of Culture, Sports and Tourism. They are awarded to those who have contributed to the arts and South Korea's pop culture.)	2010	Minister of Culture, Sports and Tourism Commendation	

== See also ==
- Munhwa Broadcasting Corporation
- MBC Voice Acting Division

== Homepage ==
- Cafe24 Voice Actor Song Do Yeong Homepage(in Korean)
- MBC Voice Acting Division Song Do Yeong Blog(in Korean)
