= Money (Lisa song) =

2021 single by Lisa

- Promotional graphic

Single by Lisa

from the album Lalisa
- A-side: "Lalisa"
- Released: November 9, 2021
- Studio: The Black Label (Seoul)
- Genre: Hip hop
- Length: 2:48
- Label: YG; Interscope
- Composers: 24; Bekuh Boom; R.Tee; Vince
- Lyricists: Bekuh Boom; Vince

Lisa singles chronology
"SG" (2021)	"Money" (2021)	"Rockstar" (2024)

Performance video
- "Money" on YouTube

"Money" is a song by Thai rapper and singer Lisa from her debut single album Lalisa (2021). It was released to US contemporary hit radio by Interscope Records on November 9, 2021, as the second single from the album. The lyrics for the track were written by Bekuh Boom and Vince, with music being composed by them alongside 24 and R.Tee. It is a hip-hop track over a laid-back horn beat with boastful lyrics about spending money and being rich. The song marked Lisa's final release as a soloist under YG and Interscope, before her departure from the labels in December 2023.

"Money" achieved commercial success worldwide and peaked at number ten on the Billboard Global 200, becoming Lisa's second top-ten hit and the longest-charting song at the time by a K-pop soloist. It reached number one in Malaysia and entered the top ten in the Czech Republic, Hungary, India, Singapore, and Slovakia. The track figured within the record charts of 26 countries, and became the longest-charting song at the time by a K-pop female soloist on the US Billboard Hot 100 and the UK Singles Chart among others. It received mixed reviews from music critics, who complimented Lisa's rap skills and confidence but criticized the song's composition and lyrics.

An exclusive performance video for "Money" was directed by Lee Sang-yoon and uploaded to Blackpink's YouTube channel on September 24, 2021. It surpassed one billion views in 2024, making Lisa the second female K-pop soloist and third overall to achieve the feat. The song has since been certified diamond in Brazil and gold in France, Poland, Portugal and Spain, and earned a Guinness World Record in 2023 for being the first K-pop track by a solo artist to reach one billion streams on Spotify.

== Background and release ==
On August 25, 2021, YG Entertainment announced that Lisa would make her solo debut with the single album titled after her given name, Lalisa. "Money" was confirmed as the B-side track on the tracklist of the single album on September 5. The song was released alongside the album on September 10, and received a performance video on September 24. Following its release, "Money" trended on TikTok and Instagram Reels in the form of dance covers, transformation edits, and edits to the television series Squid Game, and began to rise in the international charts. In response to its viral success, the song was sent by Interscope Records to US contemporary hit radio as the second single from the album on November 9, 2021.

== Composition ==
The song's lyrics were written by Bekuh Boom and Vince, and music was composed by them alongside 24 and R.Tee. Lyrically it is a boastful song about being rich and spending cash. The song is composed in the key of E minor and carries a tempo of 140 beats per minute, and is described as a dynamic hip-hop song. Nolan Feeney from Billboard explained the music of the song is close to the "contemporary American rap" and is "built around a languid horn loop."

== Critical reception ==
"Money" received mixed to positive reviews, with Lisa's performance and rapping receiving praise; on the other hand, some criticized the song's composition and lyrical content. Rhian Daly of NME criticized the lyrics as "cringe-y at best" and the sound as "obvious, safe and boring." In a more positive assessment, Starr Bowenbank of Billboard named "Money" the 20th best K-pop song of 2021 and stated that the track exhibits the "full extent of her rap skills, star power and crossover appeal." It was also included in Teen Vogue's list of the best K-pop songs of 2021, with Maddy Myer stating that "from the start, this song draws the listener in" and that it "has all the confidence Lisa is known for." Andros Resurreccion and Sonal Lad of &Asian included the song in "10 Songs that Could be on a Soundtrack to WWE PPV/PLE" for Money in the Bank.

== Performance video ==
A scene in the performance video of Lisa lighting a flame while dancing in front of a white LED screen.

On September 20, 2021, the release of a "exclusive performance video" for "Money" was announced, which was directed by Lee Sang-yoon. Initially scheduled for the release on September 23, at 12 a.m. KST, the release was postponed by a day because of the delay in the post-production of the video due to the Chuseok holiday. It became the fastest K-pop performance video to reach 500 million views on YouTube, doing so in less than six months. On May 27, 2024, the performance video surpassed one billion views on YouTube, Lisa's first video as a soloist to reach the milestone. With this, she became the second Blackpink member and the third solo K-pop artist in history to have a music video reach one billion views, after Psy's "Gangnam Style" (2012) and bandmate Jennie's "Solo" (2018). A dance practice video was released on October 11, 2021, which topped the worldwide trending list on YouTube and reached 10 million views in one day.

In the performance video, Lisa along with the backup dancers gives a choreographed performance for the song in two inter-changing settings. The video starts with Lisa dancing in the middle of an abandoned airstrip taxiway wearing a khaki-colored ensemble and green Celine chest. A billboard reading "money is a terrible master but an excellent servant" beams in the background. In the other setting, Lisa wears a checkered crop top and bralette combo, red tap shorts, and fur boots performing in a warehouse with a white LED screen at the back.

== Commercial performance ==
"Money" debuted at number 44 on the Billboard Global 200 and at number 24 on the Global Excl. U.S. for the chart issue dated September 25, 2021, and rose to number 19 and 11 respectively for the chart issue dated October 16. Following the dance practice video, the song rose from number 19 to 10 on the Global 200 with 66.3 million streams (up 28%) and 4,400 sold (up 6%) for the chart issue dated October 23. The song also rose from number 11 to 7 on the Global Excl. U.S. with 61.5 million streams (up 28%) and 3,000 sold (down 3%) for the same week. This marked Lisa's second top-ten hit on both charts after "Lalisa" and made her the third K-pop artist after BTS and Blackpink to appear in the top ten of the global chart more than once. "Money" charted on the Global 200 for 29 weeks and the Global Excl. U.S. for 34 weeks, becoming the longest charting song by a K-pop soloist and the second-longest charting song by any female K-pop act, behind Blackpink's single "How You Like That". The song also climbed to number five on the Spotify Global Chart and became the most-streamed song by a K-pop soloist and a K-pop female act on the platform. In 2023, it became the first K-pop track by a solo artist to reach one billion streams on Spotify, earning a Guinness World Record for the feat.

In the United States, "Money" debuted at number eight on Billboard's Digital Song Sales chart dated September 25, 2021 with 6,900 online copies sold. It also debuted at number one on Rap Digital Song Sales, making Lisa the first female K-pop artist to so; and at number two on R&B/Hip-Hop Digital Song Sales. For the chart issue dated October 23, the song entered the Bubbling Under Hot 100 at number 7 and Hot R&B/Hip-Hop Songs at number 49 with 4.8 million U.S. streams (up 27%) and 1,300 downloads sold (up 34%). "Money" was the second K-pop song ever to enter the Hot R&B/Hip-Hop Songs chart as well as the highest-charting. It peaked on the Bubbling Under Hot 100 at number 6, for the chart issue dated October 30, and on Hot R&B/Hip-Hop Songs at number 36, for the chart issue dated November 13. "Money" debuted on the Billboard Hot 100 at number 90 on the chart issue dated November 6 as her second career solo entry on the chart after "Lalisa", and went on to become the first song by a female K-pop soloist to chart for multiple weeks. The song debuted at number 40 on the Billboard Pop Airplay chart dated December 18, the first song by female K-pop soloist to appear on the ranking in history, and peaked at number 35 on December 25.

In South Korea, "Money" did not enter the Gaon Digital Chart but peaked at number 43 on the component Gaon Download Chart. The song also peaked at number one in Malaysia and number two in Singapore. In Canada, the song debuted at number 14 on the Canadian Digital Song Sales chart for the chart issue dated September 25. The song later entered the Canadian Hot 100 at number 95 for the chart issue dated October 9, and peaked at number 37 for the chart issue dated November 6, earning Lisa her first top 40 hit in the country. In the United Kingdom, "Money" debuted at number 81 on the UK Singles Chart and rose to a peak at number 46 for the chart dated October 29. The song charted in the UK for eight weeks, becoming the first song by a female K-pop soloist to spend multiple weeks on the chart and tying Blackpink and Selena Gomez's "Ice Cream" as the second-longest charting song by a female K-pop act at the time. It earned 206,000 UK chart units as of October 2024, the second-most for any Blackpink member's solo single after Jennie's "One of the Girls" (2023).

== Live performances ==
Lisa performed "Money" with an extended pole dancing opening as part of her solo stage during Blackpink's Born Pink World Tour starting in October 2022. In April 2023, Lisa performed a new explicit version of the song during Blackpink's set as the headlining act of the Coachella Valley Music and Arts Festival. On July 2, 2023, she performed the explicit version of the song during Blackpink's set as the headlining act of BST Hyde Park in London with a new extended dance break. On January 26, 2024, Lisa performed a medley of "Lalisa" and "Money" at the Le Gala des Pièces Jaunes charity event organized by the First Lady of France, Brigitte Macron, in Paris. She included "Money" on the setlist of her concert residency Viva La Lisa, which ran from November 12 to 29, 2026 in Las Vegas.

== Accolades ==
Awards and nominations for "Money"
Year	Organization	Award	Result	Ref.
2021	Asian Pop Music Awards	Best Dance Performance (Overseas)	Nominated	
2021	Mnet Asian Music Awards	Best Choreographer of the Year (Note: Choreographer: Leejung Lee)	Won	
2022	Joox Thailand Music Awards	Korean Song of the Year	Won	
2022	MTV MIAW Awards	Global Hit of the Year	Nominated	

World records for "Money"
Year	Organization	Award	Ref.
2023	Guinness World Records	First K-pop track by a solo artist to reach 1 billion streams on Spotify	

== Credits and personnel ==
Credits adapted from the liner notes of Lalisa.

Recording

- Recorded at The Black Label Studio (Seoul)
- Mixed at The Lab (Los Angeles)
- Mastered at Sterling Sound (New Jersey)

Personnel

- Lisa – vocals
- Bekuh Boom – lyricist, composer
- Vince – lyricist, composer
- 24 – composer, arranger
- R.Tee – composer, arranger
- Yong In Choi – recording engineer
- Yongju Bang – recording engineer
- Jason Roberts – mixing engineer
- Chris Gehringer – mastering engineer

== Charts ==
=== Weekly charts ===
Weekly chart performance
Chart (2021–2022)	Peak position
Argentina Hot 100 (Billboard)	94
Australia (ARIA)	32
Austria (Ö3 Austria Top 40)	12
Canada Hot 100 (Billboard)	37
Czech Republic Singles Digital (ČNS IFPI)	7
Euro Digital Song Sales (Billboard)	15
Finland (Suomen virallinen lista)	20
France (SNEP)	75
Germany (GfK)	14
Global 200 (Billboard)	10
Greece International (IFPI)	6
Hungary (Single Top 40)	7
Hungary (Stream Top 40)	8
India International (IMI)	5
Ireland (IRMA)	36
Italy (FIMI)	98
Lithuania (AGATA)	11
Malaysia (RIM)	1
Netherlands (Single Top 100)	89
New Zealand (Recorded Music NZ)	35
Norway (VG-lista)	32
Portugal (AFP)	23
Romania (Airplay 100)	92
Singapore (RIAS)	2
Slovakia (Singles Digitál Top 100)	9
South Korea Download (Gaon)	43
Sweden (Sverigetopplistan)	77
Switzerland (Schweizer Hitparade)	20
UK Singles (Official Charts)	46
US Billboard Hot 100	90
US Hot R&B/Hip-Hop Songs (Billboard)	36
US Pop Airplay (Billboard)	35
Vietnam (Vietnam Hot 100)	28

=== Year-end charts ===
2021 year-end chart performance for "Money"
Chart (2021)	Position
Global Excl. U.S. (Billboard)	167
Hungary (Stream Top 40)	79

2022 year-end chart performance for "Money"
Chart (2022)	Position
Global 200 (Billboard)	157
Vietnam (Vietnam Hot 100)	78

== Certifications ==
Certifications
Region	Certification	Certified units/sales
Brazil (Pro-Música Brasil)	Diamond	160,000^{‡}
France (SNEP)	Gold	100,000^{‡}
Italy (FIMI)	Gold	50,000^{‡}
New Zealand (RMNZ)	Platinum	30,000^{‡}
Poland (ZPAV)	Gold	25,000^{‡}
Portugal (AFP)	Gold	5,000^{‡}
Spain (Promusicae)	Gold	30,000^{‡}
United Kingdom (BPI)	Silver	206,000
^{‡} Sales+streaming figures based on certification alone.

== Release history ==
Release dates and formats
Region	Date	Format	Label	Ref.
United States	November 9, 2021	Contemporary hit radio	Interscope	

== See also ==
- List of Billboard Global 200 top-ten singles in 2021
- List of K-pop songs on the Billboard charts
- List of number-one songs of 2021 (Malaysia)
