= Youn Sung-ho =

South Korean comedian (born 1976)

- Born: 1976 (age 49–50); Seoul, South Korea
- Other name: Pakgu; NewJeansNim; Iljin
- Years active: 2001–present
- Agent: Bliss Entertainment

Korean name
- Hangul: 윤성호
- Hanja: 尹貹瑚
- RR: Yun Seongho
- MR: Yun Sŏngho

Youn Sung-ho (Korean: 윤성호; born 1976) is a South Korean comedian and a DJ.

== Life and career ==
Youn Sung-ho graduated from Dong-Ah Broadcasting College with a major in theater and film, and started his career after successfully auditioning with SBS in 2001. With his character Pakgu on KBS' Gag Concert, he gained some popularity nationally. He would also release music with other comedians.

In 2023, he started uploading videos on YouTube as a monk character, bearing his Buddhist name 'Iljin' (일진). Later in November 2023, he received the name 'Newjin' (뉴진) for the character at Jogyesa in Seoul, stylized in English as 'NewJeansNim'. However, he was not initiated as a full-fledged Buddhist monk. As NewJeansNim, he would infuse Buddhist scriptures with EDM beats. He was well received in South Korea by the major Buddhist sect order, the Jogye Order and the public there, and was also credited with reviving Buddhism popularity among the South Korean youths. Since then, he had played to crowds at different countries and festivals.

On May 3, 2024, NewJeansNim performed at a dance club in Kuala Lumpur, Malaysia. However, it was met with backlash from the local Buddhism community. His subsequent show in the country was cancelled. Similarly, his upcoming June 19 show in Singapore was protested by Singapore Buddhist Federation, which requested for its permits to be rejected. Authorities had stated that action would be taken if the performance involves religious elements, with laws that can penalize if the action in question is deemed to be offensive to a race, religion, ethnicity or nationality or other groups. In a statement from the nightclub hosting him, Youn will not be performing with his robe or with any religious references. The Singapore performance was announced on May 31, 2024, as being cancelled as he insisted on including two soundtracks with religious elements in the set and an agreement between him and the club could not be reached.
