= MTV Video Music Award for Best K-Pop =

Annual music video award

- BTS is the most recent recipient for "Swim".
- Awarded for: K-pop music songs
- Country: United States
- Presented by: MTV
- First award: 2019
- Currently held by: BTS – "Swim" (2026)

Highlights
- Most wins: BTS (4)
- Most nominations: BTS (5)
- Website: VMA website

The MTV Video Music Award for Best K-Pop is given at the annual MTV Video Music Award. The category was first awarded in 2019. It was criticized by K-pop fans for segregating their artists from major categories such as Video of the Year and Artist of the Year.

BTS is the most-awarded artist in this category, having won the award four times. BTS is also the most-nominated act with five nominations.

== Recipients ==
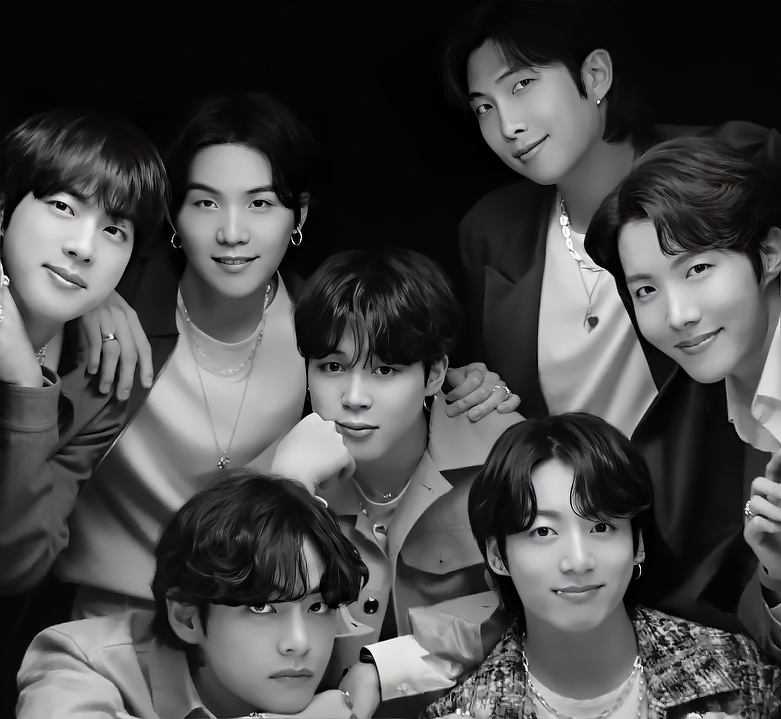
BTS holds the record for the most wins, having won four times.

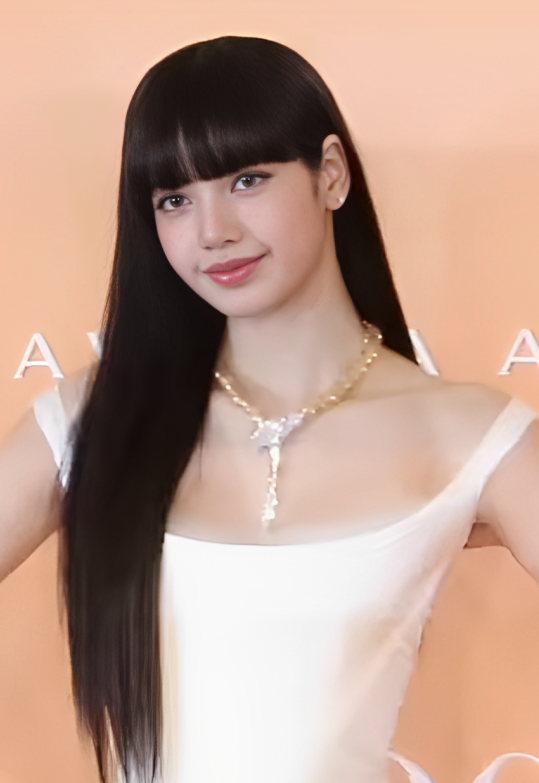
Three-time winner Lisa is the first solo artist and the first female to receive the award.

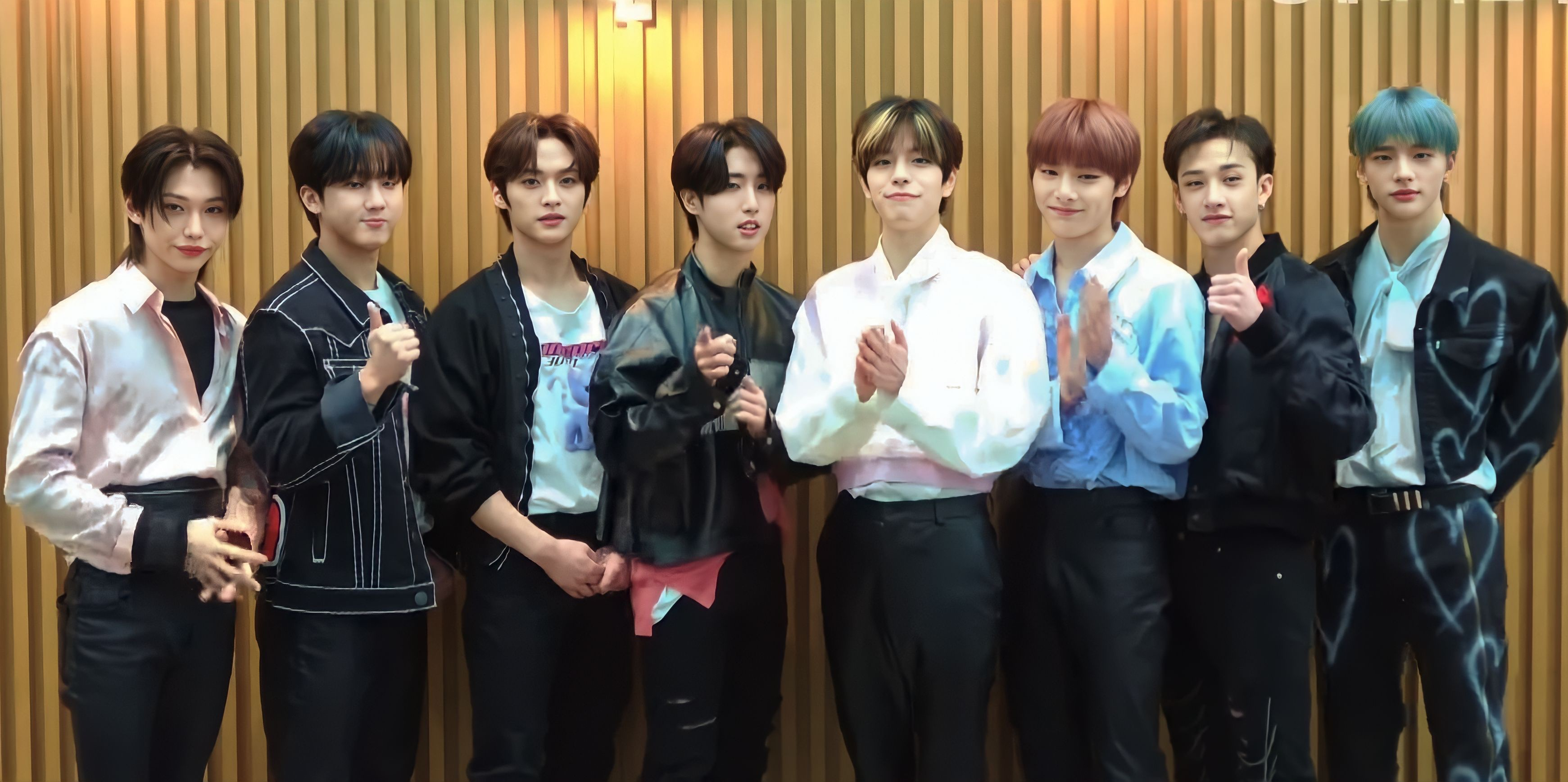
Stray Kids is a four-time nominee, one of which it won.

=== 2010s ===
Recipients
Year (Note: Each year is linked to the article about the MTV Video Music Awards held that year.)	Winner(s)	Video	Nominees	Ref.
2019	BTS (featuring Halsey)	"Boy with Luv"	Blackpink – "Kill This Love"; Exo – "Tempo"; Monsta X (featuring French Montana) – "Who Do U Love?"; NCT 127 – "Regular"; Tomorrow X Together – "Cat & Dog"	

=== 2020s ===
Recipients
Year	Winner(s)	Video	Nominees	Ref.
2020	BTS	"On"	Exo – "Obsession"; (G)I-dle – "Oh My God"; Monsta X – "Someone's Someone"; Red Velvet – "Psycho"; Tomorrow X Together – "9 and Three Quarters (Run Away)"	
2021	BTS	"Butter"	Blackpink and Selena Gomez – "Ice Cream"; (G)I-dle – "Dumdi Dumdi"; Monsta X – "Gambler"; Seventeen – "Ready to Love"; Twice – "Alcohol-Free"	
2022	Lisa	"Lalisa"	BTS – "Yet to Come (The Most Beautiful Moment)"; Itzy – "Loco"; Seventeen – "Hot"; Stray Kids – "Maniac"; Twice – "The Feels"	
2023	Stray Kids	"S-Class"	Aespa – "Girls"; Blackpink – "Pink Venom"; Fifty Fifty – "Cupid"; Seventeen – "Super"; Tomorrow X Together – "Sugar Rush Ride"	
2024	Lisa	"Rockstar"	Jungkook (featuring Latto) – "Seven"; NCT Dream – "Smoothie"; NewJeans – "Super Shy"; Stray Kids – "Lalalala"; Tomorrow X Together – "Deja Vu"	
2025	Lisa (featuring Doja Cat and Raye)	"Born Again"	Aespa – "Whiplash"; Jennie – "Like Jennie"; Jimin – "Who"; Jisoo – "Earthquake"; Rosé – "Toxic Till the End"; Stray Kids – "Chk Chk Boom"	
2026	BTS	"Swim"	Blackpink – "Jump"; Cortis – "RedRed"; Katseye – "Pinky Up"; Le Sserafim feat. J-Hope of BTS – "Spaghetti"; Lisa feat. Kentaro Sakaguchi – "Dream"	

== Statistics ==
=== Artists with multiple wins ===
4 wins

- BTS

3 wins

- Lisa

=== Artists with multiple nominations ===
5 nominations

- BTS

4 nominations

- Tomorrow X Together
- Stray Kids
- Blackpink
- Lisa

3 nominations

- Monsta X
- Seventeen

2 nominations

- Exo
- (G)I-dle
- Twice
- Aespa
