= Kang Soo-jin (voice actress) =

South Korean voice actress

- Occupation: Voice actress
- Years active: 1994–present

Korean name
- Hangul: 강수진
- RR: Gang Sujin
- MR: Kang Sujin

Kang Soo-jin (Korean: 강수진) is a South Korean voice actress. She joined Munhwa Broadcasting Corporation's voice acting division in 1994. She is involved in radio broadcasts and video game voice acting as well.

== Roles ==
=== Broadcast TV ===
- Yonggi Plus (EBS)

== See also ==
- Munhwa Broadcasting Corporation
- MBC Voice Acting Division

== Homepage ==
- MBC Voice Acting Division Kang Soo Jin Blog(in Korean)
