= Lalisa (single album) =

2021 single album by Lisa

- Digital cover

Single album by Lisa
- Released: September 10, 2021
- Recorded: 2020–2021
- Studio: The Black Label (Seoul)
- Genre: Hip-hop
- Length: 6:08
- Languages: Korean; English
- Labels: YG; Interscope
- Producers: Teddy; 24; R.Tee

Lisa chronology
Lalisa (2021)	Alter Ego (2025)

Singles from Lalisa
- 1. "Lalisa" Released: September 10, 2021; 2. "Money" Released: November 9, 2021

Lalisa is the debut single album by Thai rapper and singer Lisa. It was released on September 10, 2021, through YG Entertainment and Interscope Records. The album, a hip-hop record, was produced by Teddy, 24, and R.Tee, and was recorded at the Black Label, based in Seoul, South Korea. Bekuh Boom and Vince also received writing and arrangement credits on the album's tracks.

Upon its release, the album received mixed reviews from music critics. Commercially, Lalisa debuted at number one on the Gaon Album Chart in South Korea, becoming the best-selling album by a female soloist at the time. Lalisa also set the record for the highest first-week sales among all female acts with 736,221 copies sold, before her bandmate Jisoo broke the record. It was certified double platinum by the Korea Music Content Association (KMCA) in November 2021 for selling 500,000 copies, and was later certified triple platinum in August 2023 for selling 750,000 copies.

"Lalisa" was released as the lead single on the same day the album was released. The song debuted at number two on the Billboard Global 200 and number 84 on the US Billboard Hot 100. The B-side track "Money" was sent to US contemporary hit radio on November 9 following its viral success and peaked at number 10 on the Billboard Global 200 and at number 90 on the US Billboard Hot 100. In 2023, Lalisa earned a Guinness World Record for becoming the first album by a solo K-pop artist to reach one billion streams on Spotify.

== Background ==
On April 19, 2021, an official from YG Entertainment revealed to South Korean media outlet The Korea Herald that Lisa would debut as the third soloist from her group (after her group-mates Jennie and Rosé respectively) with schedules later to be officially announced through a notice. On July 12, through Star News, her label revealed filming for her music video was underway. On July 25, the singer uploaded two images from her in a recording studio onto her Instagram stories, where a close-up of a screen is shown alongside two different soundwaves and the caption "What’s my name?", hinting at the single album's title.

== Release and promotion ==
On August 25, 2021, YG Entertainment uploaded a teaser poster with the album's title, named after her given name, with pre-orders starting that same date. On August 27, YG released a 26-second teaser showcasing one of the visual concepts of the album. On August 30, it was confirmed by YG that the title track of the album would also be named "Lalisa". The full tracklist was released on September 5. The album was released worldwide on September 10 through YG and Interscope in conjunction with the music video for its eponymous single. Leading up to the release of the solo, Lisa held an online live countdown event on social media platforms V Live and TikTok to talk about the album and the music video. On September 11, Lisa gave an interview on The Woody Show as a special guest, marking her first appearance on a Thai talk show. On September 14, the artist held a special live broadcast on Naver Now to promote the single album. On November 12, Lisa held an Audacy Check In interview. On November 18, Lisa appeared as a guest on The Zach Sang Show and the radio show 102.7KIISFM.

=== Singles ===
"Lalisa" was released as the lead single alongside the release of the single album and received a music video on September 10, 2021. The music video recorded 73.6 million views on YouTube in 24 hours, becoming the most-viewed music video in the first 24 hours on the platform by a solo artist, breaking a record held by Ariana Grande's "thank u, next". The song debuted at number two on the Billboard Global 200 and Global Excl. U.S., marking Lisa's first solo entry and top-ten song on the charts. In the United States, "Lalisa" debuted at number 84 on the Billboard Hot 100.

The B-side track "Money" received a dance performance video on September 24, 2021. Following the song's rising success globally and in the United States, the song was sent as a single to US contemporary hit radio on November 9, 2021. "Money" peaked at number ten on the Billboard Global 200 and number seven on the Global Excl. U.S., becoming Lisa's second top-ten song on the charts. In the United States, the song peaked at number 90 on the Billboard Hot 100 as well.

=== Live performances ===
On September 10, Lisa made the debut performance of the title track "Lalisa" on The Tonight Show Starring Jimmy Fallon. She then performed the song on Naver Now on September 14. Lisa performed the song on SBS's Inkigayo on September 19, on MBC's Show! Music Core on September 25, and again on SBS's Inkigayo on September 26.

== Critical reception ==
Professional ratings
Review scores
Source	Rating
NME	2/5 stars

Lalisa received mixed reviews from music critics, who praised Lisa's performance and charisma but criticized the songs' lyrics and production. Rhian Daly writing for NME called the album "disappointingly flat" pointing out the poor quality in song production. She described the single "Lalisa" as "an awkward song" and felt that B-side track "Money" was even more disappointing. Allison S. Park of The Harvard Crimson stated that Lisa's "formidable rapping skills shine through" but also criticized the "absence of a cohesive lyrical narrative" in the lead single.

Chase McMullen writing for Beats Per Minute felt that Lisa's confident performance took center stage and praised her ability to transition smoothly between parts in the song "as to make each component feel perfectly natural". Jenna Guillaume writing for MTV praised Lisa's rapping, singing, and dancing skills. Writing for Pinkvilla, Anwaya Mane praised Lisa's "bold and confident rap" and her "inimitable and awe-inspiring high-energy performances" as well. She described "Money" as "a smooth, flowy and conversational kind of rap" which showcased Lisa's different side.

== Awards and nominations ==
Awards and nominations for Lalisa
Year	Organization	Award	Result	Ref.
2021	Asian Pop Music Awards	Top 20 Albums of the Year (Overseas)	Won	
2021	Asian Pop Music Awards	People's Choice Award (Overseas)	9th place	
2021	Hanteo Music Awards	Initial Chodong Record Award	Won	
2021	Mnet Asian Music Awards	Best Producer of the Year (Note: Producer: Teddy)	Won	
2022	Seoul Music Awards	Bonsang Award	Nominated	

World records for Lalisa
Year	Organization	Award	Ref.
2023	Guinness World Records	First album by a solo K-pop artist to reach 1 billion streams on Spotify	

== Commercial performance ==
Lalisa surpassed 700,000 pre-orders within four days, breaking the record held by bandmate Rosé's R for the highest number of pre-orders for a single album among K-pop female solo artists. As of September 10, the single album had surpassed 800,000 pre-orders. According to Korea's Hanteo Chart, the single album sold 330,129 copies on the first day and 736,221 copies on the first week of release, setting the record for the highest first-week sales among all female artists and making Lisa the first female soloist to achieve 500,000 copies in first-week sales. The physical edition went on to debut at number one on the Gaon Album Chart, while the kit debuted at number four. The album also debuted at number three on the monthly Gaon Album Chart, selling 693,079 copies as well as 60,000 copies of the kit version in the month of September. In November 2021, Lalisa was certified double platinum by the Korea Music Content Association (KMCA) for selling over 500,000 copies. The album ranked at number 20 on the year-end Gaon Album Chart with 708,475 copies sold in 2021. In August 2023, it was certified triple platinum for selling over 750,000 copies.

== Track listing ==
Lalisa track listing
No.	Title	Lyrics	Music	Arrangement	Length
1.	"Lalisa"	Teddy; Bekuh Boom	24; Bekuh Boom; Teddy	24	3:27
2.	"Money"	Bekuh Boom; Vince	24; Boom; R.Tee; Vince	24; R.Tee	2:48
Total length:					6:08

Lalisa – physical bonus tracks
No.	Title	Music	Arrangement	Length
3.	"Lalisa" (Instrumental)	24; Boom; Teddy	24	3:20
4.	"Money" (Instrumental)	24; Boom; R.Tee; Vince	24; R.Tee	2:48
Total length:				12:16

Notes

- All tracks are stylized in all caps.

== Personnel ==
Credits adapted from album liner notes.

Musicians

- Lisa – vocals, creative director
- Teddy – creative director, lyricist (track 1), composer (track 1)
- Bekuh Boom – lyricist (all tracks), composer (all tracks)
- 24 – composer (all tracks)
- Vince – lyricist (track 2), composer (track 2)
- R.Tee – composer (track 2)

Technical

- Teddy – producer (all tracks)
- 24 – producer (all tracks), arranger (all tracks)
- R.Tee – producer (all tracks), arranger (track 2)
- Yong In Choi – recording engineer (all tracks)
- Yongju Bang – recording engineer (all tracks)
- Jason Roberts – mix engineer (all tracks)
- Chris Gehringer – mastering engineer (all tracks)

Design

- Laundry Office; Hyojin Jeong, Sungmin Yook, Minkyu Lee, Heewon Moon, Minji Lee (YG) – design
- Ji Yong Yoon – photographer
- Jae Hyun Choe, Bin Seo – visual
- Gee Eun, Min Hee Park – stylist
- Seon Yeong Lee – hair
- Myung Sun Lee (Woosun) – make up
- Eunkyung Park (Unistella) – nail

Management

- YG Entertainment – executive producer
- Pauline Jyun Seon Kim, Euna Ahn, Shinil Kim, Hyojeong Jeon, Jieun Kim – A&R
- Yoon Jeong Kim – publishing
- Heon Pyo Park – head of artist management group
- Byoung Young Lee, Se Ho Kim, Eun Gon Kim, Ho Sup Shin, Jong Seong Park, Jin Won Seo, Sae Rom Lee, Sang Min Han – artist management
- Yu Jin Hung, Se Eun Kim – project management
- Jong Hyun Kah – chief innovation officer
- Bo Kyung Hwang – chief executive officer
- Min Suk Yang – executive supervisor

== Charts ==
=== Weekly charts ===
Weekly chart performance for Lalisa
Chart (2021)	Peak position
Belgian Albums (Ultratop Wallonia)	144
Finnish Physical Albums (Suomen virallinen lista)	10
Japan Combined Singles (Oricon)	40
South Korean Albums (Gaon)	1
South Korean Albums (Gaon) Kit version	4
South Korean Albums (Gaon) LP version	4
South Korean Albums (Gaon) Gold LP version	28

=== Monthly charts ===
Monthly chart performance for Lalisa
Chart (2021)	Peak position
South Korean Albums (Gaon)	3
South Korean Albums (Gaon) Kit version	10
South Korean Albums (Gaon) LP version	38

=== Year-end charts ===
Year-end chart performance for Lalisa
Chart (2021)	Position
South Korean Albums (Gaon)	20

== Certifications and sales ==
Certifications for Lalisa
Region	Certification	Certified units/sales
South Korea (KMCA)	3× Platinum	854,324

== Release history ==
Release dates and formats for Lalisa
Region	Date	Format	Label	Ref.
Various	September 10, 2021	CD; digital download; streaming	YG; Interscope	
Japan	October 2, 2021	CD maxi	YG; Interscope	
United States	November 12, 2021	CD	YG; Interscope	
South Korea	December 27, 2021	Vinyl LP	YG	
South Korea	March 28, 2022	Vinyl LP (Gold Edition)	YG	

== See also ==
- List of certified albums in South Korea
- List of Gaon Album Chart number ones of 2021
