= Lalisa (song) =

- Promotional graphic

Single by Lisa

from the album Lalisa
- Language: Korean; English
- B-side: "Money"
- Released: September 10, 2021
- Recorded: 2021
- Studio: The Black Label (Seoul)
- Genre: Hip hop; EDM
- Length: 3:20
- Label: YG; Interscope
- Composers: 24; Bekuh Boom; Teddy
- Lyricists: Teddy; Bekuh Boom

Lisa singles chronology
"Lalisa" (2021)	"SG" (2021)

Music video
- "Lalisa" on YouTube

"Lalisa" is the debut solo single by Thai rapper and singer Lisa from her debut single album of the same name (2021). It was released through YG Entertainment and Interscope Records on September 10, 2021, as the lead single from the album. Written and produced by long-time collaborator Teddy, along with Bekuh Boom and 24, "Lalisa" was described as a hip-hop track containing influences from Thai culture.

Commercially, "Lalisa" peaked at number two on the Billboard Global 200, becoming Lisa's first top-ten hit on the chart. In the United States, it topped Billboard World Digital Songs and entered the Billboard Hot 100 at number 84. The song reached number one in Malaysia and the top ten in Hungary, India, and Singapore, and figured within the record charts of 18 countries. Upon its release, "Lalisa" received criticism for its lyrics and composition; however, Lisa herself was praised for her charisma and quality of performance.

An accompanying music video was directed by Seo Hyun-seung and simultaneously uploaded to Blackpink's YouTube channel with the single's release. The video received 73.6 million views within 24 hours, breaking the record for the most-viewed music video in a single day from a soloist on the platform, and earned two Guinness World Records for the feat. To promote "Lalisa", the singer performed on The Tonight Show Starring Jimmy Fallon as well as the South Korean music programs Inkigayo and Show! Music Core. The song won Best K-Pop at the 2022 MTV Video Music Awards, making Lisa the first K-pop soloist ever to win an MTV Video Music Award.

== Background and release ==
Following the release of bandmate Rosé's debut single album R in March 2021, attention towards Lisa surfaced as the next member of Blackpink to debut as a solo artist. In an article published by The Korea Herald on April 19, a representative from YG Entertainment revealed that Lisa would debut as the third soloist from her group with schedules to be officially announced through a notice later in the year. On July 25, Lisa uploaded two images featuring herself in a studio onto her Instagram stories with the caption "What's my name?", hinting at the title of her upcoming release. On August 25, YG confirmed that her solo debut single album would be titled Lalisa, after her given name; the agency subsequently unveiled the track-listing for the album, revealing that the single of the same name would serve as the title track. The song was released on September 10, 2021, and was made available for digital download and streaming. The track was written and produced by long-time Blackpink collaborators Teddy and Bekuh Boom, with additional production credits by 24.

== Music and lyrics ==
"Lalisa" is characterized as a dynamic hip hop and EDM track that infuses Thai elements in the song's dance break. The title of single was inspired by the name the singer was given during a visit to a fortune teller during her youth, as a gesture for good luck. A week after adopting her new name, she received news from YG Entertainment that she had been accepted as a trainee. The track's production utilizes "provocative" brass riffs and dynamic rhythms that are reminiscent of sounds of sirens, and incorporates the repetition of 'Lalisa' in the lyrics. Nolan Feeney from Billboard noted that the "title track expands on the maximalist, globe-trotting sound of Blackpink bangers like 'How You Like That' with rapid-fire flows and nods to her Thai heritage". In terms of musical notation, the song is composed in the key of E-flat major and carries a tempo of 150 beats per minute.

== Critical reception ==
Professional ratings
Review scores
Source	Rating
IZM	2.5/5 stars

The song's composition and lyrical content were not well-received, although Lisa's performance received praise. Allison S. Park, writing for The Harvard Crimson, highlighted Lisa's "formidable" rapping skills but criticized the "absence of a cohesive lyrical narrative." Rhian Daly of NME gave a negative review, expressing disappointment in the song's quality and describing it as "awkward". She felt the lyrics lacked depth and were filled with hollow boasts that failed to achieve their intended impact. Park Soo-jin of IZM echoed similar sentiments, stating that while the song showcased Lisa's Thai identity and musical prowess, it fell short of being impressive. Park attributed the song's success not to its musicality, but to the brand power of her group Blackpink.

On the other hand, Chase McMullen of Beats Per Minute praised Lisa's performance, noting her ability to seamlessly navigate the song's various changes. Erica Gerald Mason of Teen Vogue observed that Lisa excelled in all aspects of the performance, from singing and rapping to dancing. "Lalisa" was included in Teen Vogue's lists of the best K-pop songs and music videos of 2021, while Marie Claire also listed it among the 20 best K-pop songs of the year.

== Commercial performance ==
"Lalisa" debuted at number two on the Billboard Global 200 and Global Excl. U.S., marking Lisa's first solo entry and top-ten song on the chart. It achieved 152.6 million streams globally in its debut week, earning the biggest worldwide weekly streaming total by a soloist and the fourth-biggest in the chart's history. The song charted on the Global 200 for 10 weeks and the Global Excl. U.S. for 13 weeks, tying for the longest-charting song by a K-pop soloist until overtaken by Lisa's single "Money". In South Korea, the song debuted at number 90 on the Gaon Digital Chart on the week dated September 5–11, with less than two days of tracking. The following week, the song rose to a peak at number 64. The song also debuted at number 28 on the Billboard K-pop Hot 100. The song peaked at number one in Malaysia and number two in Singapore.

In the United States, "Lalisa" debuted at number 84 on the Billboard Hot 100 and at number six on the Digital Song Sales chart with 9,600 digital copies sold in its first week, giving Lisa two top-ten hits on the latter chart alongside "Money". The song also debuted atop the US Billboard World Digital Song Sales chart, her first chart-topper as a soloist. In the United Kingdom, "Lalisa" debuted at number 68 on the UK Singles Chart and at number 13 on the UK Singles Downloads Chart. It earned 80,000 UK chart units as of October 2024, the fifth-most for any Blackpink member's solo single after Jennie's "One of the Girls" (2023), her own song "Money", Jennie's "Solo" (2018), and Rosé's "On the Ground". In Canada, the song debuted at number 42 on the Canadian Hot 100 and at number seven on the Canadian Digital Song Sales chart.

== Music video ==
A scene from the music video, showcasing Lisa's intricate Thai-inspired ensemble as she sits atop an elaborately-sculpted throne.

An accompanying music video for the song was uploaded to Blackpink's YouTube channel in conjunction with the release of "Lalisa"; the video was preceded with a teaser—which was released via the same platform three days earlier. The music video became the most-viewed debut video and the most-viewed video by a soloist in 24 hours, garnering 73.6 million views; the video broke the records of Rosé's "On the Ground" and Taylor Swift's "Me!" featuring Brendon Urie, which received 41.6 million views and 65.2 million views in 24 hours, respectively. The music video surpassed 100 million views in just 49 hours, the fastest video to reach this mark by any K-pop female solo artist. The video surpassed 500 million views in June 2022, extending her record as the fastest video by a K-pop female soloist to do so.

The visual includes numerous costume changes, including an intricate ensemble based on traditional Thai culture. Lisa sits on an elaborately sculpted throne donning a golden beaded dress and cape, earcuffs with golden jasmines, and a tall pointed headdress called "rad klao yod" (Thai: รัดเกล้ายอด) that is worn mainly in traditional dance forms. After the music video was released, the sale of traditional outfits surged at a popular market in the Thai capital, Bangkok. The Phanom Rung Historical Park that was depicted in the music video in Buriram also increased in visitors. Thai prime minister Prayut Chan-o-cha commended Lisa among Thai artists whose work reflects a dedication to inspire Thais in creative industries and expressed interest in promoting Thailand's soft power following the success of "Lalisa".

== Live performances and promotion ==
Following the release of her single album on September 10, 2021, Lisa debuted the title track the same day on The Tonight Show Starring Jimmy Fallon. The title track's choreography was choreographed by Kiel Tutin, Sienna Lalau and Lee-jung Lee. On September 19, she performed "Lalisa" on SBS's Inkigayo, marking her solo debut on South Korean television. Lisa performed the song on MBC's Show! Music Core on September 25 and again on SBS's Inkigayo on September 26. The song was included on the setlist as part of Lisa's solo stage during Blackpink's Born Pink World Tour starting in October 2022. On January 26, 2024, Lisa performed a medley of "Lalisa" and "Money" at the Le Gala des Pièces Jaunes charity event organized by the First Lady of France, Brigitte Macron, in Paris.

== Accolades ==
Awards and nominations for "Lalisa"
Year	Organization	Award	Result	Ref.
2021	Asian Pop Music Awards	Song of the Year (Overseas)	Won	
2021	Asian Pop Music Awards	Top 20 Songs of the Year (Overseas)	Won	
2021	Asian Pop Music Awards	Best Arranger (Overseas) (Note: Arranger: 24)	Nominated	
2021	Asian Pop Music Awards	Best Composer (Overseas) (Note: Composers: 24, Bekuh Boom, and Teddy)	Nominated	
2021	Asian Pop Music Awards	Record of the Year (Overseas)	Nominated	
2021	Mnet Asian Music Awards	Best Dance Performance Solo	Nominated	
2021	Mnet Asian Music Awards	Song of the Year	Nominated	
2022	Joox Thailand Music Awards	Korean Song of the Year	Nominated	
2022	MTV Video Music Awards	Best K-Pop	Won	

World records for "Lalisa"
Year	Organization	Award	Ref.
2021	Guinness World Records	Most viewed YouTube music video by a solo artist in 24 hours	
2021	Guinness World Records	Most viewed YouTube music video in 24 hours by a solo K-pop artist	
2022	Guinness World Records	First solo K-pop winner at the MTV Video Music Awards	

Music program awards
Program	Date	Ref.
Music Bank	September 17, 2021	

== Credits and personnel ==
Credits adapted from the liner notes of Lalisa.

Recording

- Recorded at The Black Label Studio (Seoul)
- Mixed at The Lab (Los Angeles)
- Mastered at Sterling Sound (New Jersey)

Personnel

- Lisa – vocals
- Teddy – lyricist
- Bekuh Boom – lyricist, composer
- 24 – composer, arranger
- Yong In Choi – recording engineer
- Yongju Bang – recording engineer
- Jason Roberts – mixing engineer
- Chris Gehringer – mastering engineer

== Charts ==
=== Weekly charts ===
Weekly chart performance
Chart (2021–23)	Peak position
Australia (ARIA)	76
Canada Hot 100 (Billboard)	42
Euro Digital Song Sales (Billboard)	9
Global 200 (Billboard)	2
Greece International (IFPI)	58
France (SNEP)	175
Hungary (Single Top 40)	7
India International (IMI)	6
Ireland (IRMA)	87
Japan Hot 100 (Billboard)	26
Lithuania (AGATA)	89
Malaysia (RIM)	1
Netherlands (Dutch Global Top 40)	7
New Zealand Hot Singles (RMNZ)	9
Portugal (AFP)	128
Singapore (RIAS)	2
South Korea (Gaon)	64
South Korea (K-pop Hot 100)	28
UK Singles (Official Charts)	68
US Billboard Hot 100	84
US World Digital Song Sales (Billboard)	1
Vietnam (Vietnam Hot 100)	84

=== Monthly charts ===
Monthly chart performance
Chart (2021)	Peak position
South Korea (Gaon)	95
South Korea (K-pop Hot 100)	88

=== Year-end charts ===
Year-end chart performance
Chart (2021)	Position
Global Excl. U.S. (Billboard)	176

== Certifications ==
Certifications
Region	Certification	Certified units/sales
Brazil (Pro-Música Brasil)	Platinum	40,000^{‡}
^{‡} Sales+streaming figures based on certification alone.

== Release history ==
Release formats for "Lalisa"
Region	Date	Format	Label	Ref.
Various	September 10, 2021	Digital download; streaming	YG; Interscope	
Italy	October 8, 2021	Contemporary hit radio	Universal	

== See also ==
- List of Billboard Global 200 top-ten singles in 2021
- List of K-pop songs on the Billboard charts
- List of Music Bank Chart winners (2021)
- List of number-one songs of 2021 (Malaysia)
