= The Clancy World Tour =

2024–25 concert tour by Twenty One Pilots

- Tour by Twenty One Pilots
- Promotional poster
- Location: North America; Oceania; South America; Europe
- Associated album: Clancy; Breach
- Start date: August 15, 2024
- End date: October 26, 2025
- Legs: 5
- No. of shows: 96
- Supporting acts: Balu Brigada; DJ Etta; DJ Haiti; Dayglow

Twenty One Pilots concert chronology
- The Icy Tour (2022); The Clancy World Tour (2024–25)

The Clancy World Tour (also known as The Clancy Tour: Breach for the September–October 2025 shows) was the ninth concert tour by the American musical duo Twenty One Pilots, in support of their seventh and eighth studio albums, Clancy (2024) and Breach (2025). The tour began on August 15, 2024, at the Ball Arena in Denver, and concluded on October 26, 2025, at BMO Stadium in Los Angeles.

== Background and promotion ==
The band announced the tour alongside the release of the second single for Clancy, "Next Semester", on March 27, 2024. The North America, Oceania, and Europe dates were announced on the same day, while Latin America dates were announced on May 9.

Balu Brigada was announced as the opening act for the North America leg of the tour, and returned for the Australia & New Zealand, Latin America and Europe tour legs. Due to high demand, second shows in Denver, Dallas, and Boston were announced on April 2, 2024, along with a third show in Columbus, Ohio. A second show in Buenos Aires was announced on December 13.

On June 12, 2025, a second North American leg, titled The Clancy Tour: Breach, was announced alongside the lead single for Breach, "The Contract". On June 20, second shows in Toronto and Los Angeles were announced. A concert film documenting the Mexico City show on February 20, 2025, titled Twenty One Pilots: More Than We Ever Imagined, was theatrically released on February 26, 2026, and grossed $5.8 million at the box office. A live album titled More Than We Ever Imagined: Live in Mexico City was released on August 7, 2026, and consists of the recordings heard in the film.

== Setlist ==
=== The Clancy World Tour ===
This set list is representative of the show on August 16, 2024, in Denver. It is not representative of all concerts for the duration of the tour.

Main stage, part 1

1. "Overcompensate"
2. "Holding On to You"
3. "Vignette"
4. "Car Radio"
5. "The Judge" (contains excerpts from "Cut My Lip")
6. "The Craving" (Jenna's version)
7. "Tear in My Heart"
8. "Backslide"
9. "Shy Away"
10. "Heathens"
11. "Next Semester"
12. "Routines in the Night"

B-stage

13. "Addict with a Pen" / "Migraine" / "Forest" / "Fall Away"
14. "Mulberry Street"

Main stage, part 2

15. "Navigating"
16. "Nico and the Niners"
17. "Heavydirtysoul"
18. "My Blood"
19. "Oldies Station"
20. "Fake You Out"
21. "Guns for Hands"
22. "Lavish"
23. "Ride"
24. "Paladin Strait" (contains excerpts from "Bandito")

Encore

25. "Jumpsuit"
26. "Midwest Indigo"
27. "Stressed Out"
28. "Trees"

Notes

- "Slowtown" was played instead of "Oldies Station" on the opening night of the tour in Denver.
- Both "Slowtown" and "Oldies Station" were played in Orlando and Columbus.
- A stripped-back version of "Hometown" was played in Columbus after "My Blood".
- "Fake You Out" was not played in Indianapolis, Australia, New Zealand, South America and Europe.
- "Oldies Station" was not played in Brisbane, South America and Europe.
- Starting from the Mexico City show, "The Line", which was released at the end of the Australia & New Zealand leg, replaced the medley of "Addict with a Pen" / "Migraine" / "Forest" / "Fall Away".
- Starting from the Łódź show, "Doubt (demo)" was played after "My Blood".
- Starting from the Bologna show, excerpts of "Cut My Lip" were no longer played.
- "Doubt (demo)" was not played in Glasgow.

=== The Clancy Tour: Breach ===
This set list is representative of the show on September 18, 2025, in Cincinnati. It is not representative of all concerts for the duration of the tour.

Main stage, part 1

1. "Overcompensate"
2. "The Contract"
3. "Rawfear"
4. "We Don't Believe What's on TV"
5. "House of Gold"
6. "Tear in My Heart"
7. "Backslide"
8. "Lane Boy"
9. "Shy Away"
10. "Heathens"
11. "Next Semester"
12. "Routines in the Night"

B-stage

13. "Message Man" / "Pet Cheetah"
14. "Polarize"
15. "Chlorine"

Main stage, part 2

16. "Jumpsuit"
17. "Nico and the Niners"
18. "Heavydirtysoul"
19. "The Line"
20. "Garbage"
21. "Doubt (demo)"
22. "Ride"
23. "Drum Show"

Encore

24. "City Walls"
25. "Guns for Hands"
26. "Stressed Out"
27. "Trees"

Notes

- During the September 21, 2025 show in Toronto, "Rawfear", "House of Gold", "Backslide", "Lane Boy", "Nico and the Niners", "Heavydirtysoul", "The Line", "Garbage", "Doubt (demo)", "City Walls", "Guns for Hands", and "Stressed Out" were not played due to precautions the duo took because of an incoming thunderstorm.
- Starting from the Hershey show, "Tally" was played after "Doubt (demo)" and "House of Gold" was taken off the setlist.
- "Rawfear" was not played in Bristow.
- "The Line" and "Garbage" were not played in Orange Beach due to a piano malfunction.
- "Downstairs" was played before "Ride" for the final two shows in Los Angeles.

== Tour dates ==
List of concerts, showing date, city, country and venue
Date	City	Country	Venue	Opening acts	Attendance	Revenue
North America
August 15, 2024	Denver	United States	Ball Arena	Balu Brigada	20,489	$2,327,451
August 16, 2024	Denver	United States	Ball Arena	Balu Brigada	20,489	$2,327,451
August 18, 2024	Salt Lake City	United States	Delta Center	Balu Brigada	9,568	$1,154,893
August 21, 2024	Portland	United States	Moda Center	Balu Brigada	12,324	$1,450,287
August 22, 2024	Seattle	United States	Climate Pledge Arena	Balu Brigada	13,743	$1,841,915
August 24, 2024	Oakland	United States	Oakland Arena	Balu Brigada	12,632	$1,642,794
August 25, 2024	Sacramento	United States	Golden 1 Center	Balu Brigada	12,229	$1,559,348
August 27, 2024	Inglewood (Note: Labeled as Los Angeles in promotional material.)	United States	Intuit Dome	Balu Brigada	20,362	$3,165,595
August 28, 2024	Inglewood	United States	Intuit Dome	Balu Brigada	20,362	$3,165,595
August 30, 2024	Phoenix	United States	Footprint Center	Balu Brigada	12,469	$1,745,658
August 31, 2024	Las Vegas	United States	MGM Grand Garden Arena	Balu Brigada	11,386	$1,498,983
September 3, 2024	Austin	United States	Moody Center	Balu Brigada	10,410	$1,291,643
September 4, 2024	Houston	United States	Toyota Center	Balu Brigada	10,856	$1,291,643
September 6, 2024	Dallas	United States	American Airlines Center	Balu Brigada	21,544	$2,577,893
September 7, 2024	Dallas	United States	American Airlines Center	Balu Brigada	21,544	$2,577,893
September 10, 2024	Duluth (Note: Labeled as Atlanta in promotional material.)	United States	Gas South Arena	Balu Brigada	10,453	$1,377,961
September 11, 2024	Orlando	United States	Kia Center	Balu Brigada	12,916	$1,761,229
September 13, 2024	Raleigh	United States	PNC Arena	Balu Brigada	13,644	$1,626,798
September 14, 2024	Philadelphia	United States	Wells Fargo Center	Balu Brigada	14,654	$1,971,703
September 15, 2024	Baltimore	United States	CFG Bank Arena	Balu Brigada	10,854	$1,367,570
September 17, 2024	Newark	United States	Prudential Center	Balu Brigada	11,199	$1,295,928
September 18, 2024	Brooklyn	United States	Barclays Center	Balu Brigada	10,582	$1,114,750
September 20, 2024	Boston	United States	TD Garden	Balu Brigada	20,983	$2,727,976
September 21, 2024	Boston	United States	TD Garden	Balu Brigada	20,983	$2,727,976
September 25, 2024	Montreal	Canada	Bell Centre	Balu Brigada	10,965	$1,082,855
September 27, 2024	Toronto	Canada	Scotiabank Arena	Balu Brigada	13,698	$1,493,129
September 28, 2024	Cleveland	United States	Rocket Mortgage FieldHouse	Balu Brigada	12,378	$1,527,731
September 29, 2024	Detroit	United States	Little Caesars Arena	Balu Brigada	12,900	$1,667,210
October 1, 2024	Chicago	United States	United Center	Balu Brigada	23,100	$2,720,810
October 2, 2024	Chicago	United States	United Center	Balu Brigada	23,100	$2,720,810
October 4, 2024	Columbus	United States	Nationwide Arena	Balu Brigada	38,292	$4,601,680
October 5, 2024	Columbus	United States	Nationwide Arena	Balu Brigada	38,292	$4,601,680
October 6, 2024	Columbus	United States	Nationwide Arena	Balu Brigada	38,292	$4,601,680
October 8, 2024	Indianapolis	United States	Gainbridge Fieldhouse	Balu Brigada	9,180	$1,341,233
October 9, 2024	Nashville	United States	Bridgestone Arena	Balu Brigada	13,688	$1,517,310
October 10, 2024	St. Louis	United States	Enterprise Center	Balu Brigada	12,444	$1,452,154
October 12, 2024	Minneapolis	United States	Target Center	Balu Brigada	14,161	$1,631,254
Oceania
November 17, 2024	Auckland	New Zealand	Spark Arena	Balu Brigada	10,591	$916,768
November 19, 2024	Melbourne	Australia	Rod Laver Arena	Balu Brigada	12,345	$1,119,289
November 21, 2024	Brisbane	Australia	Brisbane Entertainment Centre	Balu Brigada	9,862	$963,129
November 24, 2024	Sydney	Australia	Qudos Bank Arena	Balu Brigada	12,991	$1,243,33
Latin America
January 16, 2025	Cota (Note: Labeled as Bogotá in promotional material.)	Colombia	Coliseo MedPlus	Balu Brigada	—N/a	—N/a
January 19, 2025	Santiago	Chile	Estadio Bicentenario La Florida	Balu Brigada; DJ Haiti	—N/a	—N/a
January 22, 2025	Curitiba	Brazil	Pedreira Paulo Leminski	Balu Brigada	—N/a	—N/a
January 24, 2025	Rio de Janeiro	Brazil	Farmasi Arena	Balu Brigada	—N/a	—N/a
January 26, 2025	São Paulo	Brazil	Allianz Parque	Balu Brigada	—N/a	—N/a
January 28, 2025	Buenos Aires	Argentina	Movistar Arena	Balu Brigada; DJ Etta	—N/a	—N/a
January 29, 2025	Buenos Aires	Argentina	Movistar Arena	Balu Brigada; DJ Etta	—N/a	—N/a
February 20, 2025	Mexico City	Mexico	Estadio GNP Seguros	Balu Brigada	—N/a	—N/a
February 22, 2025	Zapopan (Note: Labeled as Guadalajara in promotional material.)	Mexico	Estadio Tres de Marzo	Balu Brigada	—N/a	—N/a
February 24, 2025	Monterrey	Mexico	Estadio Banorte	Balu Brigada	—N/a	—N/a
Europe
April 7, 2025	Hamburg	Germany	Barclays Arena	Balu Brigada	—N/a	—N/a
April 8, 2025	Berlin	Germany	Uber Arena	Balu Brigada	—N/a	—N/a
April 9, 2025	Łódź	Poland	Atlas Arena	Balu Brigada	—N/a	—N/a
April 12, 2025	Prague	Czech Republic	O2 Arena	Balu Brigada	—N/a	—N/a
April 13, 2025	Vienna	Austria	Wiener Stadthalle	Balu Brigada	—N/a	—N/a
April 16, 2025	Zürich	Switzerland	Hallenstadion	Balu Brigada	—N/a	—N/a
April 17, 2025	Bologna	Italy	Unipol Arena	Balu Brigada	—N/a	—N/a
April 21, 2025	Madrid	Spain	WiZink Center	Balu Brigada	—N/a	—N/a
April 22, 2025	Barcelona	Spain	Palau Sant Jordi	Balu Brigada	—N/a	—N/a
April 24, 2025	Décines-Charpieu (Note: Labeled as Lyon in promotional material.)	France	LDLC Arena	Balu Brigada	—N/a	—N/a
April 27, 2025	Munich	Germany	Olympiahalle	Balu Brigada	—N/a	—N/a
April 28, 2025	Milan	Italy	Forum di Milano	Balu Brigada	—N/a	—N/a
April 30, 2025	Amsterdam	Netherlands	Ziggo Dome	Balu Brigada	—N/a	—N/a
May 1, 2025	Köln	Germany	Lanxess Arena	Balu Brigada	—N/a	—N/a
May 2, 2025	Paris	France	Accor Arena	Balu Brigada	—N/a	—N/a
May 5, 2025	Glasgow	Scotland	OVO Hydro	Balu Brigada	—N/a	—N/a
May 6, 2025	Birmingham	England	Resorts World Arena	Balu Brigada	—N/a	—N/a
May 8, 2025	Belfast	Northern Ireland	SSE Arena	Balu Brigada	—N/a	—N/a
May 9, 2025	Dublin	Ireland	3Arena	Balu Brigada	—N/a	—N/a
May 11, 2025	Manchester	England	Manchester Arena	Balu Brigada	—N/a	—N/a
May 13, 2025	London	England	The O_{2} Arena	Balu Brigada	—N/a	—N/a
May 14, 2025	London	England	The O_{2} Arena	Balu Brigada	—N/a	—N/a

List of The Clancy Tour: Breach concerts, showing date, city, country, venue, opening act, attendance and gross revenue
Date	City	Country	Venue	Opening act(s)	Attendance	Revenue
September 18, 2025	Cincinnati	United States	TQL Stadium	Dayglow	—	—
September 20, 2025	Toronto	Canada	Budweiser Stage	Dayglow	—	—
September 21, 2025	Toronto	Canada	Budweiser Stage	— (Note: Dayglow's set was cancelled due to incoming severe weather that prompted the headliner to take the stage early.)	—	—
September 23, 2025	Milwaukee	United States	American Family Insurance Amphitheater	Dayglow	—	—
September 24, 2025	Tinley Park	United States	Credit Union 1 Amphitheatre	Dayglow	—	—
September 27, 2025	Hershey	United States	Hersheypark Stadium	Dayglow	—	—
September 28, 2025	Burgettstown	United States	The Pavilion at Star Lake	Dayglow	—	—
September 30, 2025	Hartford	United States	XFINITY Theatre	Dayglow	—	—
October 1, 2025	Bangor	United States	Maine Savings Amphitheater	Dayglow	—	—
October 4, 2025	Wantagh	United States	Northwell at Jones Beach Theater	Dayglow	—	—
October 5, 2025	Bristow	United States	Jiffy Lube Live	Dayglow	—	—
October 7, 2025	Virginia Beach	United States	Veterans United Home Loans Amphitheater	Dayglow	—	—
October 8, 2025	Charlotte	United States	PNC Music Pavilion	Dayglow	—	—
October 10, 2025	West Palm Beach	United States	iTHINK Financial Amphitheatre	Dayglow	—	—
October 11, 2025	Tampa	United States	MidFlorida Credit Union Amphitheatre	Dayglow	—	—
October 14, 2025	Orange Beach	United States	The Wharf Amphitheater	Dayglow	—	—
October 15, 2025	Alpharetta	United States	Ameris Bank Amphitheatre	Dayglow	—	—
October 17, 2025	Birmingham	United States	Coca-Cola Amphitheater	Dayglow	—	—
October 19, 2025	Rogers	United States	Walmart AMP	Dayglow	—	—
October 20, 2025	Dallas	United States	Dos Equis Pavilion	Dayglow	—	—
October 23, 2025	Chula Vista	United States	North Island Credit Union Amphitheatre	Dayglow	—	—
October 25, 2025	Los Angeles	United States	BMO Stadium	Dayglow	—	—
October 26, 2025	Los Angeles	United States	BMO Stadium	Dayglow	—	—
