= Moaning (album) =

Studio album by Moaning
- Released: 2 March 2018
- Genre: Rock; post-punk
- Length: 33:43
- Label: Sub Pop
- Producer: Alex Newport

Moaning chronology
Moaning (2018)	Uneasy Laughter (2021)

Singles from Moaning
- 1. "Don't Go" Released: 2017; 2. "Artificial" Released: 2018; 3. "Tired" Released: 2018

Moaning is the debut studio album by Los Angeles band Moaning, released on 2 March 2018 by Sub Pop. The band wrote songs for the album several years prior to the release, with most of the debut being recorded and released following being signed to the label. Upon release, Moaning received generally favorable reviews, with critics praising the album's energy and fusion of genres, but expressed mixed views on the impact of the album's tone and lyrical themes, and the use of distortion and noise.

== Background and recording ==
Formed in 2015, Moaning began creating songs for a debut album prior to a record contract in a practice space in Echo Park, with three years between writing, recording and pre-production and release. Lead Sean Solomon stated that the sound of the album was influenced from attending the LA punk rock venue The Smell and bands including Abe Vigoda and No Age. The debut album was recorded and engineered over several months by City and Colour producer Alex Newport in Los Angeles. The album received a distribution contract from Sub Pop following the band's performance at SXSW.

== Release and promotion ==
A music video for The Same was released prior to the debut's announcement. Following announcement, music videos were released for Don't Go, directed by Michael Schmelling, Artificial, directed by A Stranger, Tired, filmed with the California Institute of the Arts and directed by Ambar Navarro, and Misheard, an animated music video evocative of "1990s MTV adverts" by Steve Smith.

== Critical reception ==
Professional ratings
Aggregate scores
Source	Rating
Metacritic	68%
Review scores
Source	Rating
AllMusic	4/5 stars
Clash	7/10
DIY	3/5 stars
Exclaim!	8/10
No Ripcord	6/10
PopMatters	7/10
The Line of Best Fit	6.5/10
Uncut	6/10

Moaning received "generally favorable" reviews from critics according to review aggregator Metacritic. Paul Simpson of Allmusic described the album as a "powerful debut" and "alarmingly focused set of tense, bitter post-punk tunes", highlighting the "deep questions" around relationships posed in Solomon's lyrics. Calling it a "strikingly accomplished debut", Cole Waterman of PopMatters commended the energy of the album's "rolling instrumentation" and "immediate hooks" as an appropriate dichotomy to the dour and "direct derision" of the lyrics, although noting it could sometimes "veer toward juvenilia". Similarly, Wilf Skimmer of Clash noted the "high-energy songs" and "abrasive instrumentation" surpassed the "malaise" of the lyrics and tone of the album hinted at by the song titles. Lisa Sookraj of Exclaim! considered the band's fusion of noise and shoegaze with post-punk and new wave managed to establish a distinctive sound. Peter Watts enjoyed the album's juxtaposition of "ghostly vocals" and evocation of a "dark, endlessly sad hole of despair" and "sense of rage and helplesness", but found at times the album could be "pitiless" and "a lot to take". Joe Goggins of DIY viewed the album to be a "cohesive record" with a "lot of polish", but considered it to be derivative of existing post punk bands including Preoccupations and Women. Carl Purvis of No Ripcord considered that the album, in "straddling the ridge that separates shoegaze from post-punk", led the album to be "suffocated by the sheer density of the walls of noise that Moaning are all to happy to build". Similarly, Ben Lynch of The Line of Best Fit noted that in spite of the "flashes of brilliance", the album possessed a "lack of dynamism" and "absence of ideas", considering the lyrics to be "lost amid the wall of noise".

== Track listing ==
Moaning track listing
No.	Title	Length
1.	"Don't Go"	2:51
2.	"Tired"	3:12
3.	"Artificial"	3:32
4.	"Close"	2:54
5.	"Does This Work For You"	3:57
6.	"The Same"	3:43
7.	"For Now"	2:46
8.	"Useless"	3:42
9.	"Misheard"	3:39
10.	"Somewhere in There"	3:24
Total length:		33:43

== Personnel ==
- Sean Solomon – vocals, guitar
- Pascal Stevenson – bass, synth
- Andrew MacKelvie – drums
- Alex Newport – producer
- Dave Cerminara – engineer
- April Golden – mastering
