= Full Bloom =

Full Bloom may refer to:

- Full Bloom (Kara album), a 2013 album by Kara
- Full Bloom (Acoustic Strawbs album), a 2004 album by Acoustic Strawbs
- Full Bloom (Soft Circle album), a 2007 album by Soft Circle
- Full Bloom (311 album), a 2024 album by 311
- Full Bloom, a 1977 album by Carol Douglas
- Full Bloom, a realty television series that premiered in November 2020
- Full Bloom, a Facebook game published by Playdom

== See also ==
- Full-On Bloom, a 1993 album by American band Gigolo Aunts
- In Full Bloom (disambiguation)
