= Dead Plane =

EP by No Age
- Released: March 26, 2007
- Genres: Experimental rock, noise rock
- Label: Teenage Teardrops
- Producers: F. Bermudez, No Age

No Age chronology
Get Hurt (2007)	Dead Plane (2007)	Sick People Are Safe (2007)

Dead Plane is an EP released by Los Angeles–based band No Age on Los Angeles's Teenage Teardrops label. It was limited to 500 copies, and of those 500 copies pressed, 400 are blue vinyl and 100 on grey/beige swirl vinyl. The EP was mastered by Peter Lyman, who did the same for the other EPs and singles by No Age. The EP is one of five limited edition singles and EPs released by No Age on five different labels on the same day, March 26, 2007. There are two covers, one a special edition. The regular cover features a painting done by Amanda Vietta, also responsible for the exterior re-do of The Smell as seen on No Age's Weirdo Rippers. The album has since sold out all 500 copies from Teenage Teardrop's online store. The EP's title song, "Dead Plane," was played by No Age when they appeared on an episode of Juan's Basement, which was broadcast on Pitchfork Media's Pitchfork.tv site. "Dead Plane" was also mentioned in the article about No Age, Let It Rip, by The New Yorker, which gained them substantial fans and increased popularity. In August 2008, a video for Goat Hurt, track two on the EP, was made, for a DVD release on No Age drummer Dean Spunt's label, Post Present Medium entitled New Video Works. At this point the EP was long out of print, so No Age pressed up a limited run of 240 copies for a 3-song 10" sold mainly at the F*** Yeah! festival on August 30, 2008.

== Tracks ==
There are four tracks on the 12 inches (305 mm) 500 grams (18 oz) vinyl EP. All the tracks are original. The first track on the record is Dead Plane which, in an April 17, 2008, interview, No Age named as one of their top two favorite songs to play, along with Everybody's Down. The second track on the A-side is Goat Hurt. On the album's B-side are the two tracks Never Not Beaten which precedes You is My Hot Rabbit. Of these four songs on the EP, only the title track went on to be reproduced, as it was the ninth track on No Age's album Weirdo Rippers.

== Track listing ==
1. "Dead Plane" – 5:11
2. "Goat Hurt" – 1:41
3. "Never Got Beaten" – 2:38
4. "You Is My Hot Rabbit" – 3:00
