= Hisham Bharoocha =

American musician and visual artist

- Born: March 12, 1976 (age 50); Niigata, Japan
- Origin: Providence, Rhode Island
- Genres: Noise rock, experimental rock
- Occupations: Musician; artist
- Instruments: Drums; vocals
- Years active: 1994–present
- Member of: Kill Alters, Yokubari
- Formerly of: Lightning Bolt; Black Dice; Among Natives; Soft Circle; Pixeltan; GATAX; Boredoms
- Website: hishamakirabharoocha.com

Hisham Akira Bharoocha (born March 12, 1976 in Niigata, Japan) is an American musician and visual artist. Bharoocha lives in Brooklyn, performs as Yokubari, and is a member of the band Kill Alters; he is also a former member of the Providence bands Lightning Bolt and Black Dice.

== Early life and education ==
Bharoocha was born in Niigata, Japan, to a Japanese mother and Burmese Indian Gujarati father. The family moved to Tokyo and then to Toronto when he was two, and Bharoocha spent his elementary school years in Los Angeles and San Diego. His father died of cancer when he was 10 years old; as an adult, memories of the experience inspired the 24-foot mural and sound installation Bharoocha created for the Memorial Sloan Kettering Cancer Center in Brooklyn. He attended junior high and high school in Tokyo, where he first met Eye and other members of Boredoms.

After graduating from high school, Bharoocha attended the Rhode Island School of Design (RISD) in Providence, Rhode Island, where he studied various art forms such as video and photography.

== Career ==
At RISD, Bharoocha met fellow musician Brian Gibson and became vocalist of the band Lightning Bolt after their first show. Bharoocha performed with Lightning Bolt from 1995–1996, but the band's trio recording was never released; the only officially-released Lightning Bolt music with Bharoocha was "Revenge," a track on the Load Records Repopulation Program compilation.

In 1996, Bharoocha began drumming for the Clutters, a band that the following year became Black Dice. After graduating from RISD in 1998, Bharoocha moved to New York City and became actively involved in the music and art scene; the other members of Black Dice also moved to New York, and Bharoocha continued playing with the band until his departure in 2004. Bharoocha's work with Black Dice included 2002's Beaches & Canyons, included in Pitchfork's best of 2000-2004 and Tiny Mix Tapes' best albums of the decade, as well as Wolf Eyes and Black Dice (2003), Miles of Smiles (2004), and Creature Comforts (2004).

Bharoocha released two albums as Soft Circle: 2009's Full Bloom was a solo endeavor, and 2010's Shore Obsessed included bandmate Ben Vida. Bharoocha also played drums for Pixeltan, who released several EPs on DFA records.

Bharoocha served as musical director and drummer 4 in the Boredoms' 77 Boadrum performance on July 7, 2007 at the Empire–Fulton Ferry State Park in Brooklyn, New York. He reprised his roles the following year for 88 Boadrum, a duo of free concerts performed at the La Brea Tar Pits in Los Angeles and the Williamsburg waterfront in Brooklyn; each concert began at 8:08pm local time and featured 88 drummers selected by Boredoms and Bharoocha, with Boredoms participating in the west coast performance and Gang Gang Dance conducting in New York.

In July 2009, Bharoocha released a split 12 inch with High Places on the label PPM.

Bharoocha is a member of the band Kill Alters, a trio with Bonnie Baxter and Nicos Kennedy; he appears on the band's releases No Self Helps (2017) and Armed To The Teeth (2022), among others.

=== Visual art and fashion ===
In addition to music, Bharoocha is also a visual artist and photographer known for his collage and mural work. He has had solo exhibitions of his work at D'Amelio Terras gallery in New York, as well as Vleeshal, a state run space in The Netherlands. He has been in numerous group exhibitions at galleries such as Deitch Projects, John Connelly Presents and Yerba Buena Center for the Arts. His work has been published in Artforum, V, i-D, Flaunt, Tokion and more.

Bharoocha collaborated with Sonic Youth's Kim Gordon, model Erin Wasson, No Age, Opening Ceremony, Maria Cornejo and United Bamboo on a line of sunglasses called Phosphorescence, and with Solange on a line of Puma sneakers.
