= Skeleton (Abe Vigoda album) =

Studio album by Abe Vigoda
- Released: July 8, 2008
- Genre: Punk
- Length: 32:11
- Label: Post Present Medium

Abe Vigoda chronology
Skeleton	Crush

Skeleton is the third album by Abe Vigoda. It was released by Post Present Medium on July 8, 2008.

Professional ratings
Aggregate scores
Source	Rating
Metacritic	83/100
Review scores
Source	Rating
AllMusic	4/5 stars
The A.V. Club	A−
Drowned in Sound	8/10
Mojo	4/5 stars
MSN Music (Consumer Guide)	A−
musicOMH	4/5 stars
NME	7/10
Pitchfork	8.3/10
PopMatters	7/10
Uncut	4/5 stars

== Track listing ==
1. Dead City - 2:56
2. Bear Face - 2:21
3. Lantern Lights - 2:18
4. Animal Ghosts - 1:49
5. Whatever Forever - 0:41
6. Cranes - 2:20
7. Live-Long - 2:55
8. The Garden - 3:27
9. Hyacinth Girls - 1:46
10. World Heart - 1:37
11. Gates - 1:46
12. Visi Rings - 2:14
13. Endless Sleeper - 3:49
14. Skeleton - 2:12
