= Get Hurt =

Get Hurt may refer to:

- Get Hurt (album), by the Gaslight Anthem (2014)
- Get Hurt (EP), by No Age (2007)
- "Get Hurt", a song by AFI from AFI (2017)
