= Throwing Shade (disambiguation) =

Throwing Shade is a TV show. It may also refer to:

- "Throwing Shade", song by Abe Vigoda from the album Crush (2010)
- "Throwing Shade", song by Lil Baby from his debut album Harder Than Ever (2018)
