= Gun Outfit =

Punk band

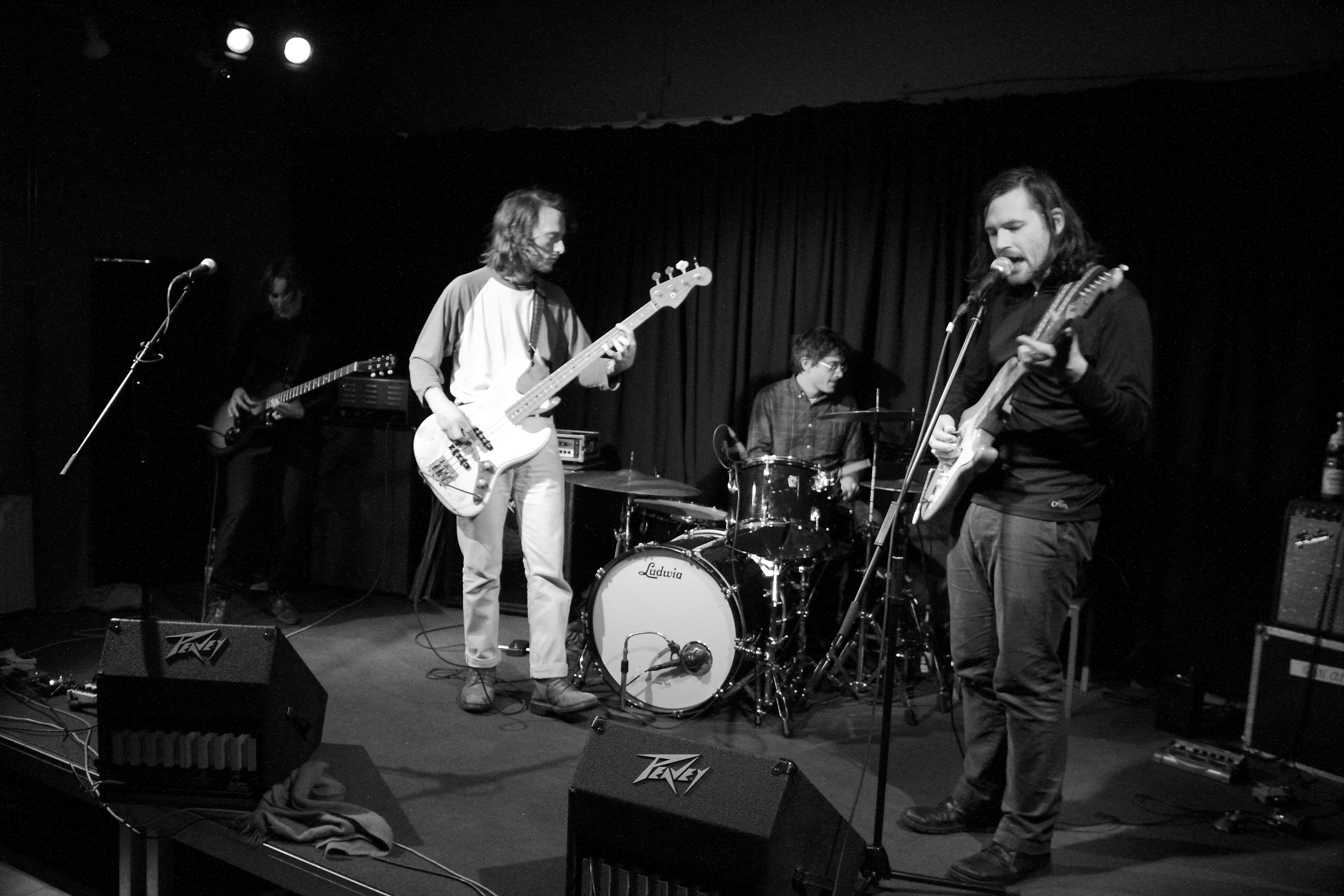
- Gun Outfit at Club W71, Weikersheim in 2016

Background information
- Origin: Olympia, Washington, U.S.
- Genres: Indie rock; post-punk; psychedelia
- Years active: 2007–present
- Labels: Post Present Medium, Paradise of Bachelors
- Members: Dylan Sharp; Caroline Keith; Daniel Swire; Kayla Cohen; Henry Barnes
- Past members: Reuben Storey; Adam Payne

Gun Outfit are an indie rock band formed in Olympia, Washington, in 2007 by Dylan Sharp and Caroline Keith. They have released five full-length albums and multiple EPs on independent record labels. They are now based in Los Angeles.

== History ==
The band was formed by guitarists, vocalists, and co-songwriters Dylan Sharp and Carrie Keith in Olympia in 2007. The original touring and recording line-up was rounded out by drummer Reuben Storey. In 2008 they released their debut EP On The Beach on Los Angeles label Post Present Medium ran by Dean Allen Spunt of No Age.

Their first full-length album Dim Light was released in 2009 on the same label. Their style of playing on these first releases was often compared to Sonic Youth, Beat Happening and bands on SST Records like Hüsker Dü and Dinosaur Jr. due to being noisy guitar rock with a subtle roots twang and mixture of low and high vocals.

Gun Outfit's second album Possession Sound, also on Post Present Medium, was released in 2010.

The band's third LP Hard Coming Down was released in 2012. By this point a more relaxed sound with elements of folk, country, and psych dominated their music. That year they relocated to Los Angeles, and were joined by Adam Payne on bass, with Daniel Swire replacing Storey on drums.

Gun Outfit signed to North Carolina indie label Paradise of Bachelors, and in 2015 released their fourth album Dream All Over with them.

In October 2017 their fourth long-player, Out of Range, was released. This was recorded with Henry Barnes (Amps for Christ/Man Is the Bastard).

== Discography ==
=== Albums ===
- Dim Light (2009) Post Present Medium
- Possession Sound (2010) Post Present Medium
- Hard Coming Down (2012) Post Present Medium
- Dream All Over (2015) Paradise of Bachelors
- Out of Range (2017) Paradise of Bachelors
- Process and Reality (2026) Upset The Rhythm

=== Extended plays ===
- On the Beach - Post Present Medium, 7-inch EP, MP3 (2008)
- Gun Outfit - Nasjonal, Cassette, MP3 (2009)
- High Places - Make A Mess Records, 12-inch EP, MP3 (2010)
- Two Way Player - Wharf Cat Records, 12-inch EP, CD, MP3 (2016)
