= Moaning (band) =

American alternative rock band

- Origin: Los Angeles, California, US
- Genres: Post-punk; shoegaze
- Years active: 2014–2023 (on hiatus)
- Label: Sub Pop
- Past members: Sean Solomon; Pascal Stevenson; Andrew MacKelvie
- Website: moaningmusic.com

Moaning was an American, Los Angeles–based alternative rock band, formed by musicians Sean Solomon, Pascal Stevenson and Andrew MacKelvie in 2014. After self-releasing a self-titled EP, the band was signed to Sub Pop Records and has subsequently released two full-length albums.

== History ==
Stevenson and Solomon met as classmates at Taft High School and soon formed the band Moses Campbell, which began performing at local venues in the Los Angeles area, particularly and most notably the Smell. MacKelvie joined the band after a series of chance meetings at various local venues. After the break-up of Moses Campbell and another mutual band Heller Keller, Solomon wrote the songs "Don't Go" and "Misheard" and shared them with Stevenson and MacKelvie, and the three began writing and rehearsing together under the name Moaning.

The band's first release, a self-titled EP, was self-released in 2014 and contained the songs "The Same" and "Misheard." The band released a video for "The Same" that caught the attention of Alex Newport, who subsequently offered to produce the band's debut LP. The first album was recorded by the beginning of 2017 and the band sent it to various labels. Sub Pop offered to sign them after a label representative saw them perform at that year's edition of South by Southwest.

The band's debut album, Moaning, was released in March 2018 to generally positive reviews.

Having started writing for a second album before the release of their debut, the band recorded their second full-length record with producer Newport after a US and European tour through the first half of 2018 with METZ and Preoccupations. Songwriting was heavily impacted by Solomon's sobriety since the release of the first album, with the singer and guitarist stating that it made him more efficient and that there was a clear distinction between songs written before and after his stopping use of alcohol and marijuana.

In January 2020, the band released the first song from the upcoming album titled "Ego," with an accompanying video. The album, titled Uneasy Laughter, was released in March 2020 to overall positive reviews, receiving an average score of 70 on Metacritic. Most reviewers regarded the record as representing an evolution in the band towards a new wave-influenced sound. Uncut praised the album as "A more mature expression of self-understanding." The Irish Times gave the album a score of four stars out of five, with the reviewer remarking "Sean Solomon, Pascal Stevenson and Andrew MacKelvie’s perfect shorthand is born of a decade of collaboration, with Solomon’s doleful voice conveying a leavening quality, an interesting seriousness amid the playfulness." Meanwhile, a review from Paste was less favorable regarding the integration of new wave influences, stating "It’d be much better if the band actually managed to define themselves without leaning on ’80s nostalgia." after much speculation, moaning quietly went on an indefinite hiatus in 2023 to pursue other interests, leaving the bands future uncertain.

== Members ==
- Sean Solomon – vocals, guitar (2014–2023)
- Pascal Stevenson – bass, synthesizers (2014–2023)
- Andrew MacKelvie – drums, percussion (2014-2023)

== Discography ==
=== Studio albums ===
- Moaning (2018)
- Uneasy Laughter (2020)

=== EP ===
- Moaning (2014)
