= Overcompensation =

Overcompensation may refer to:

- Overcompensation (linguistics) or hypercorrection, non-standard language use resulting from over-application of a perceived grammar rule
- Overcompensation (psychology) or compensation, covering real or imagined deficiencies in one area of life with excellence in another area
- Overcompensating (webcomic), a journal/daily blog comic by Jeffrey Rowland
- Overcompensate (song), a 2024 song by Twenty One Pilots
- Overcompensating (TV series), a television series on Amazon Prime Video
