= Clancy (album) =

2024 studio album by Twenty One Pilots

Studio album by Twenty One Pilots
- Released: May 24, 2024
- Recorded: 2021–2024
- Genres: Alternative rock; pop rock; hip-hop; synth-pop; indie rock
- Length: 47:18
- Labels: Fueled by Ramen; Elektra
- Producers: Tyler Joseph; Paul Meany

Twenty One Pilots chronology
Scaled and Icy (2021)	Clancy (2024)	Breach (2025)

Singles from Clancy
- 1. "Overcompensate" Released: February 29, 2024; 2. "Next Semester" Released: March 27, 2024; 3. "Backslide" Released: April 25, 2024; 4. "The Craving" Released: May 22, 2024

Clancy is the seventh studio album by the American musical duo Twenty One Pilots, released on May 24, 2024, through Fueled by Ramen and Elektra Records. Titled after the protagonist introduced in their fifth studio album, Trench (2018), the visual album is the first of two records ending the duo's decade-long conceptual series which began with Blurryface (2015).

Written by frontman Tyler Joseph and produced with frequent collaborator Paul Meany, Clancy was announced on February 29, 2024, following weeks of speculation. Four singles preceded the album's release: "Overcompensate", "Next Semester", "Backslide", and "The Craving". Clancy received positive reviews from critics and reached number one on the album charts in Australia, Germany and Scotland, number two in the UK, number three in the US, and the top five in various other countries. To support the album and its successor Breach (2025), the band embarked on the Clancy World Tour from August 2024 to October 2025.

== Background and promotion ==
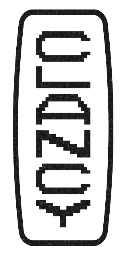
Logo for Clancy

In February 2021, while promoting Twenty One Pilots's sixth studio album, Scaled and Icy (2021), lead singer Tyler Joseph revealed that the album's closing track "Redecorate" acts as "an intentional hint at what he wants to try to do next", contrasting the song's more ominous tone with the "brand new, sparkling, happy, colorful" sound of its parent album. In a September 2022 interview, Joseph initially stated that the band's next album would conclude the storyline of the character Clancy and the fictional city of Dema that were introduced in their fifth album, Trench (2018).

On February 15, 2024, the cover art of Scaled and Icy, Vessel (2013), Blurryface (2015) and Trench were updated to be partially concealed with red tape on streaming platforms. Shortly after, people began to post on their social media that they had received mail from the band containing cryptic letters. Around the same time, billboards and posters in numerous countries (such as Spain, Canada and Poland) began displaying a new band logo.

On February 22, 2024, the band released a narrated video on their social media platforms, titled "I Am Clancy". In the video, the narrator, who reveals himself to be Clancy, summarizes the story of the previous three albums and his multiple attempts to escape from Dema; (Note: As depicted in the music videos for "Heavydirtysoul" (2017), "Jumpsuit" (2018), "Nico and the Niners" (2018), "Levitate" (2018), "Saturday" (2021), and "The Outside" (2022), as well as the livestream concert in support of Scaled and Icy (2021)) he ends the video by stating that he would be "returning to Trench". Clancy was officially announced on February 29, 2024, with its release initially set for May 17. Its lead single, "Overcompensate", was released on the same day.

"It's because I love these songs, and I believe in them enough to pretend to sing in front of a camera to each one. And that's what we're gonna do, because that's how I want to present this album."

— Tyler Joseph on why every song from the album has a music video

On March 18, Tyler Joseph announced that each song on the album would have an accompanying music video, with all set to be released alongside the album; its release was subsequently delayed by a week due to the production timeframe required to complete the videos. Despite this, the band announced listening parties that would take place in selected stores through various countries, between May 18 and May 23, before the album's release.

The second single, "Next Semester", was released on March 27. The third single, "Backslide", was released on April 25. On May 9, the band debuted "The Craving" live during their small-scale concert at the Electric Ballroom in London. The song was released on May 22 as the fourth single; this version is subtitled "(Single Version)" in contrast to the album's "(Jenna's Version)", and features different instrumentation and production.

On May 24, the day of the album's release, the band premiered the music video for 10 songs of the album (excluding those for the singles, which had already been released) on YouTube through a livestream, wherein the band offered insights into the creation of each song and its respective video. Each video was individually uploaded to the band's YouTube channel independent of the livestream after its premiere. On May 29, the band released an online-only collection, titled Clancy – Digital Remains, which includes live versions of the four singles and several pages containing new photos and "artifacts" in relation to the making of the album. The music video for "Paladin Strait", the album's closing track, was released on June 21 and directed by Jensen Noen.

On September 19, the duo performed "Routines in the Night" on The Tonight Show Starring Jimmy Fallon. The performance was recorded in advance, airing as the closer of the episode.

== Composition and themes ==
Debra Kate Schafer of The Aquarian Weekly described Clancy as an "amalgamation" of every iteration of Twenty One Pilots' artistry. It is an alternative rock, pop rock, hip-hop, synth-pop, bedroom pop, emo rap, indie rock, and garage rock album that blends rock and roll musicianship, subtle hip hop directions, and an "all-encompassing" pop-stylized atmosphere. The album was primarily composed and produced by Joseph and frequent collaborator Paul Meany, with additional writing contributions from Jake Torrey on "Routines in the Night". Five of the album's thirteen tracks were written entirely by Joseph. Several songs were originally written on the baritone ukulele before they were arranged on other instruments, such as the bass guitar.

Like previous works in the series, Clancy is framed in the metaphorical world of "Trench" and the dystopian city of "Dema". It follows the titular character as he returns to Trench to free his fellow citizens of Dema after he escaped and was granted a "miraculous power".

=== Songs ===
Clancy's accompanying storyline resumes in its opener "Overcompensate", a 1990s-tinged rocktronica track driven by synthesizer layers, hip hop stylings, and a "racing" breakbeat. The track is also the first one that the band finished while they were working on the album. Its upbeat production continues with the punk-infused garage rock tune "Next Semester", which details a panic attack Joseph suffered as a college student. "Backslide" is a hip hop and rap rock track that elevates itself with echoing and morphed background vocals and "nonchalant" spoken verses, broken up by a "grueling" and "emotive" chorus. Conceived as a "love letter" to the band's home state and region, "Midwest Indigo" is a "thrilling" and "joyous" pop-punk track. Opening with a "reverberating" alarm, "Routines in the Night" contains subtle vocal mannerisms that pays homage to "The Run and Go", a track from Vessel (2013). "Vignette" serves as a direct homage to Trench, with recurring themes of death, rebirth, decay and awakening—changing from moments of isolation to the culminating finale of a layered and crowded admission of "no, not me, it's for a friend". "The Craving (Jenna's Version)" is a tender acoustic piece written for Joseph's wife Jenna, which presents itself as an "ode to the imperfections of such a strong emotion, and that even in the existence of tragedy and self-doubt, love prevails".

"Lavish" is a dream pop track that brings "funk and flair" to the record, and is punctuated by "hypnotic rap verses" and includes a "hearty bassline". "Navigating" is a dance-rock and synth-rock track reminiscent of Bloc Party, which is propelled by "relentless drumming" from Dun. "Snap Back" includes references to previous songs such as "Heavydirtysoul" and "Backslide", with vocals that are "smooth yet rugged". "Oldies Station" is a "simple, feel-good" track, wherein Joseph encourages the listener to "push on through". "At the Risk of Feeling Dumb" presents the duo at "their heaviest" on the album, with an "earwormy chorus" and "vivid repetition". The album closes with "Paladin Strait", a track containing whirring synths that are partnered with "beautiful guitar chords", which are described as feeling like a "voyage, a grand adventure in which its soft plucking and gentle strums usher you forward on a glorious but daunting journey".

== Tour ==
A concert tour in support of the album, the Clancy World Tour, was announced alongside the release of "Next Semester". The tour consists of over 70 shows spanning four continents, beginning at Ball Arena in Denver, Colorado on August 15, 2024, and concluded at The O2 Arena in London on May 14, 2025. Five small-scale concerts collectively titled "An Evening with Twenty One Pilots" were held prior to the tour, with the first taking place at the Bowery Ballroom in New York City on May 2, 2024, the second at the Metropol in Berlin on May 7, the third at the Electric Ballroom in London on May 9, the fourth at the Lunario del Auditorio Nacional in Mexico City on May 14, and the fifth at the Newport Music Hall in Columbus, Ohio on May 24. On August 9, New Zealand alt-pop band Balu Brigada was announced to be the opening act for the US leg of the tour, they also opened for the Australia & New Zealand, Latin American, and European tour legs. The setlist of the tour consists of over 30 songs.

A second North American leg was announced with the release of "The Contract", the lead single of Breach (2025). Titled as The Clancy Tour: Breach and supporting both albums, it consisted of 23 shows, beginning on September 18, 2025, in Cincinnati, Ohio, and concluded on October 26 in Los Angeles, California.

== Critical reception ==
Professional ratings
Aggregate scores
Source	Rating
AnyDecentMusic?	7.7/10
Metacritic	78/100
Review scores
Source	Rating
AllMusic	4/5 stars
The Arts Desk	4/5 stars
Classic Rock	3.5/5 stars
Dork	5/5 stars
Jesus Freak Hideout	4.5/5 stars
Kerrang!	5/5
NME	3/5 stars
Northern Transmissions	8.2/10
Paste	6.8/10
Spectrum Culture	3.5/5 stars

According to the review aggregator Metacritic, Clancy received "generally favorable reviews" based on a weighted average score of 78 out of 100 from 5 critic scores. The review aggregator site AnyDecentMusic? compiled nine reviews and gave Clancy an average of 7.7 out of 10, based on their assessment of the critical consensus.

Neil Z. Yeung of AllMusic and Tom Carr of The Arts Desk commended Twenty One Pilots for creating "reliably catchy" and "intriguing" songs that not only "captured the imagination of a legion of fans", but can also grab the attention of listeners who are unaware of their "fascinating narrative". Kiana Doyle of the Associated Press called Clancy an "energizing" and "triumphant" conclusion to the band's arc that is filled with vim, vigor, and nostalgia. Vicky Greer, writing for Classic Rock, considered the album to be "a very strong outing" for the band, but felt that "they falter where they fall back into old habits instead of embracing the album's more innovative moments".

Ali Shutler of Dork called Clancy "a gorgeous, intricate record that cycles through tender, heartfelt moments, fiery rage, flexing swagger and frustrated self-destruction". Manus Hopkins of Kerrang! described the album as "creative, colorful and endlessly charismatic". Jon Dolan of Rolling Stone reviewed the album positively, saying it showed the band's "midlife growth," praising Clancy for not feeling scattered in its juggling of many genres and sounds.

=== Accolades ===
Year-end lists
Publication	Accolade	Rank	Ref.
Alternative Press	50 Best Albums of 2024	—N/a	
Kerrang!	The 50 Best Albums of 2024	4	
Rock Sound	Top 24 Albums of 2024	1	

== Commercial performance ==
Clancy marked Twenty One Pilots' fourth consecutive top three album on the Billboard 200, debuting at number three with 143,000 album-equivalent units. Registering the biggest sales week for any rock album in 2024, in either equivalent album units or traditional album sales, Clancy opened with 38.64 million on-demand official streams and 113,000 pure album copies. The album debuted at number one on the Top Rock Albums and number two on the Top Alternative Albums charts. Every song from the album charted in the top 50 of the US Hot Rock & Alternative Songs chart. The album also debuted at number three on the Canadian Albums Chart, making it their fourth top five album in the country.

The album was leading the UK midweek charts upon its release, but debuted at number two on the UK Albums Chart behind Taylor Swift's The Tortured Poets Department (2024). It also debuted at number one on the Official Vinyl Albums Chart and the Official Record Store Chart.

Clancy became Twenty One Pilots' second number one album in Australia, debuting atop the ARIA Albums Chart on May 31, 2024. It also debuted at number one in Germany and Scotland. In eleven other countries, the album reached the top five.

== Usage in media ==
"Overcompensate" was used in a title card for Nickelodeon's Kids' Choice Awards on July 13, 2024. "Midwest Indigo" is included on the soundtrack for the 2024 video game EA Sports FC 25. "Overcompensate" is included on the soundtrack for the 2024 video game NHL 25. Both "Overcompensate" and "Next Semester" are featured in the video game Fortnite Festival as Jam Tracks.

== Track listing ==
All tracks are written by Tyler Joseph, with additional writers noted.

No.	Title	Writer(s)	Length
1.	"Overcompensate"	Paul Meany	3:56
2.	"Next Semester"		3:54
3.	"Backslide"		3:00
4.	"Midwest Indigo"	Meany	3:16
5.	"Routines in the Night"	Meany; Jake Torrey	3:22
6.	"Vignette"	Meany	3:22
7.	"The Craving" (Jenna's version)		2:54
8.	"Lavish"	Meany	2:38
9.	"Navigating"	Meany	3:43
10.	"Snap Back"	Meany	3:30
11.	"Oldies Station"		3:48
12.	"At the Risk of Feeling Dumb"		3:23
13.	"Paladin Strait"	Meany	6:28
Total length:			47:18

Sample credits

- "Overcompensate" contains an interpolation of the song "Bandito", from their 2018 album, Trench, written by Joseph and Meany.

Note

- "The Craving" has two versions, respectively subtitled "(Jenna's Version)" and "(Single Version)"; the two feature different production and instrumentation from each other.

== Personnel ==
All credits are adapted from the album's liner notes.

=== Twenty One Pilots ===
- Tyler Joseph – vocals, programming, samples, bass, keyboards, ukulele, guitar, production, executive production
- Josh Dun – drums, programming, drum engineering, backing vocals

=== Technical ===
- Paul Meany – production, synthesizers, programming, backing vocals
- Adam Hawkins – mixing
- Joe LaPorta – mastering
- Spencer Stewart – production on "The Craving (Single Version)"
- Alex Wilder – bass drums on "The Craving (Single Version)"
- Mike Elizondo – upright bass on "The Craving (Single Version)"

=== Additional ===
- Pete Ganbarg – A&R
- Gregg Nadel – A&R
- Chris Woltman – executive production
- Mark Eshleman – creative direction (video)
- Brandon Rike – creative direction (design)
- Ashley Osborn – artist photography
- Laura Proepper – styling
- Björgvin Sigurdarson – additional photography
- Lindsay Fishman – additional photography
- Katie Robinson – marketing direction
- Thom Skarzynski – marketing direction
- Ashley Pimenta – marketing direction, management
- Tim Davideit – digital marketing
- Adam Ruemmer – digital marketing
- Anne Declemente – A&R administration
- Chris Woltman – management
- Patrick Templeman – business management
- Ryan Shaw – business management
- Amy Davidson – business management
- Peter Paterno – legal
- Laurie Soriano – legal
- Andrew Simon – booking
- Jeff Krones – booking
- Mark Ngui – international booking
- Margo Scott – business affairs
- Aaron Romanello – business affairs
- Brian Ranney – packaging production

== Charts ==
=== Weekly charts ===
Weekly chart performance for Clancy
Chart (2024)	Peak position
Argentine Albums (CAPIF)	4
Australian Albums (ARIA)	1
Austrian Albums (Ö3 Austria)	2
Belgian Albums (Ultratop Flanders)	4
Belgian Albums (Ultratop Wallonia)	3
Canadian Albums (Billboard)	3
Croatian International Albums (HDU)	3
Dutch Albums (Album Top 100)	2
Finnish Albums (Suomen virallinen lista)	20
French Albums (SNEP)	4
German Albums (Offizielle Top 100)	1
Hungarian Albums (MAHASZ)	6
Irish Albums (Official Charts)	3
Italian Albums (FIMI)	11
Japanese Digital Albums (Oricon)	27
Japanese Hot Albums (Billboard Japan)	79
Lithuanian Albums (AGATA)	6
New Zealand Albums (RMNZ)	3
Norwegian Albums (VG-lista)	39
Polish Albums (ZPAV)	7
Portuguese Albums (AFP)	7
Scottish Albums (Official Charts)	1
Spanish Albums (Promusicae)	5
Swedish Physical Albums (Sverigetopplistan)	12
Swiss Albums (Schweizer Hitparade)	5
UK Albums (Official Charts)	2
US Billboard 200	3
US Top Rock & Alternative Albums (Billboard)	2

=== Year-end charts ===
Year-end chart performance for Clancy
Chart (2024)	Position
Australian Vinyl Albums (ARIA)	42
Belgian Albums (Ultratop Flanders)	196

== Certifications ==
Certifications for Clancy
Region	Certification	Certified units/sales
United Kingdom (BPI)	Gold	100,000^{‡}
^{‡} Sales+streaming figures based on certification alone.

== See also ==
- List of concept albums
