= Miles of Smiles =

EP by Black Dice
- Released: April 12, 2004
- Recorded: 2004
- Genre: Experimental, noise
- Length: 27:32
- Label: Fat Cat, DFA

Black Dice chronology
Beaches & Canyons (2003)	Miles of Smiles (2004)	Creature Comforts (2004)

Professional ratings
Review scores
Source	Rating
AllMusic	3/5 stars
Pitchfork	(7.9/10)
Tiny Mix Tapes	4/5 stars

Miles of Smiles is an EP by the experimental band Black Dice, released in 2004.

== Track listing ==
1. "Miles of Smiles" - 13:12
2. "Trip Dude Delay" - 14:20
