= Everything in Between (No Age album) =

Studio album by No Age
- Released: September 28, 2010
- Recorded: 2009–2010 in Los Angeles
- Genres: Art punk, noise rock, experimental rock, art rock
- Length: 38:01
- Label: Sub Pop

No Age chronology
| Losing Feeling (2009) | Everything in Between (2010) | An Object (2013) |

Singles from Everything in Between
- 1. "Glitter" Released: August 24, 2010

Professional ratings
Aggregate scores
| Source | Rating |
|---|---|
| AnyDecentMusic? | 7.8/10 |
| Metacritic | 80/100 |
Review scores
| Source | Rating |
| AllMusic | 4/5 stars |
| The A.V. Club | B− |
| The Guardian | 4/5 stars |
| Los Angeles Times | 3/4 stars |
| Mojo | 4/5 stars |
| MSN Music (Expert Witness) | A |
| NME | 7/10 |
| Pitchfork | 8.8/10 |
| Rolling Stone | 3/5 stars |
| Spin | 8/10 |

Everything in Between is the second studio album from noise rock band No Age. It was released in 2010 on Sub Pop. The album's artwork was designed by Brian Roettinger, who also designed the artwork for Nouns.

In late August, Sub Pop posted a trailer on their Vimeo page for the album featuring a leather bound figure pumping a device to the beat of "Life Prowler". On September 21, No Age released the album for streaming on The Guardian website. It was ranked the 13th best album of 2010 by Pitchfork.

== Track listing ==
| No. | Title | Length |
|---|---|---|
| 1. | "Life Prowler" | 2:38 |
| 2. | "Glitter" | 3:49 |
| 3. | "Fever Dreaming" | 3:50 |
| 4. | "Depletion" | 3:18 |
| 5. | "Common Heat" | 2:27 |
| 6. | "Skinned" | 2:58 |
| 7. | "Katerpillar" | 1:31 |
| 8. | "Valley Hump Crash" | 3:52 |
| 9. | "Sorts" | 2:35 |
| 10. | "Dusted" | 2:44 |
| 11. | "Positive Amputation" | 2:53 |
| 12. | "Shed and Transcend" | 3:21 |
| 13. | "Chem Trails" | 2:55 |
| 14. | "Inflorescence (ITunes Bonus Track Only)" | 2:50 |
