= Soft Circle =

- Origin: Brooklyn, NY, United States
- Genres: Experimental rock
- Years active: 2006 – present
- Labels: Eastern Developments Music, Geographic North Records
- Members: Hisham Bharoocha, Ben Vida
- Website: MySpace

Soft Circle is the project of New York City based musician Hisham Bharoocha. His debut album, Full Bloom, was released January 23, 2007, on the Eastern Developments Music record label. His sound is characterized by looped guitar riffs, drums, and repeated vocals. In 2009 Ben Vida (formerly of Town & Country) joined Soft Circle. The duo released an album entitled "Shore Obsessed" on November 6, 2010.

Hisham Bharoocha is active on the social media platform Instagram as “Soft Circle” *(10/25/18)

== Discography ==
- Full Bloom - Eastern Developments Music (2007)
- "End of Summer" 7" - You Can't Hide Your Love Forever Vol. 6 - Geographic North Records (2010)
- "Shore Obsessed"- PPM (2010)

=== Splits ===
- with High Places 12" on PPM Records (2009)
