= Snares Like a Haircut =

Studio album by No Age
- Released: January 26, 2018
- Studio: Infrasonic Sound (Echo Park, California)
- Genre: Noise rock; noise pop; art punk
- Length: 39:12
- Label: Drag City
- Producer: Pete Lyman

No Age chronology
An Object (2013)	Snares Like a Haircut (2018)	Goons Be Gone (2020)

Snares Like a Haircut is the fourth studio album by American noise rock duo No Age. The album was released on January 26, 2018, through Drag City Records.

== Critical reception ==
Professional ratings
Aggregate scores
Source	Rating
AnyDecentMusic?	7.5/10
Metacritic	84/100
Review scores
Source	Rating
AllMusic	4.5/5 stars
The A.V. Club	B+
DIY	4/5 stars
The Guardian	5/5 stars
Mojo	4/5 stars
Pitchfork	8.0/10
Q	4/5 stars
Record Collector	3/5 stars
Uncut	8/10
Vice	A

Snares Like a Haircut received favorable reviews upon release. According to Metacritic which assigns a normalized rating out of 100 to reviews from mainstream critics, the album received a score of 84, based on 20 reviews, indicating "universal acclaim".

== Track listing ==
All lyrics are written by Randy Randall and Dean Allen Spunt; all music is composed by No Age.

No.	Title	Length
1.	"Cruise Control"	3:31
2.	"Stuck in the Changer"	3:14
3.	"Drippy"	2:38
4.	"Send Me"	3:55
5.	"Snares Like a Haircut"	3:44
6.	"Tidal"	3:30
7.	"Soft Collar Fad"	2:26
8.	"Popper"	2:42
9.	"Secret Swamp"	2:47
10.	"Third Grade Rave"	2:48
11.	"Squashed"	4:19
12.	"Primitive Plus"	3:38
Total length:		39:12

== Personnel ==
The following were credited with the artwork, mixing, and production of the album.

- Phillip Broussard Jr. — Mixing
- Daphne Fitzpatrick — Artwork
- Pete Lyman — Engineer, Mastering
- No Age — Primary Artist
- Randy Randall — Group Member
- Brian Roettinger — Design, Typography
- John Sinclair — Engineer
- Dean Spunt — Group Member

== Charting ==
Chart (2018)	Peak position
US Independent Albums (Billboard)	46
US Heatseekers Albums (Billboard)	12
