= Goons Be Gone =

Studio album by No Age
- Released: June 5, 2020
- Length: 32:56
- Label: Drag City

No Age chronology
Snares Like a Haircut (2018)	Goons Be Gone (2020)	People Helping People (2022)

Singles from Goons Be Gone
- 1. "Turned to String" Released: February 25, 2020; 2. "Feeler" Released: March 30, 2020; 3. "War Dance" Released: April 23, 2020; 4. "Head Sport Full Face" Released: May 18, 2020

Professional ratings
Aggregate scores
Source	Rating
AnyDecentMusic?	6.7/10
Metacritic	74/100
Review scores
Source	Rating
AllMusic	4/5 stars
And It Don't Stop	A−
Beats Per Minute	66%
DIY	2.5/5 stars
Exclaim!	7/10
Pitchfork	7.3/10
Tom Hull – on the Web	A−

Goons Be Gone is the fifth studio album by American noise rock band No Age. It was released on June 5, 2020, under Drag City.

== Singles ==
On February 25, 2020, No Age announced the release of their new album, along with the first single "Turned to String". On March 30, 2020, they released the second single and music video "Feeler", directed by Kersti Jan Werdal. The third single "War Dance" was released on April 23, 2020. On May 18, 2020, their fourth single "Head Sport Full Face" was released.

== Critical reception ==
Goons Be Gone was met with generally positive reviews. At Metacritic, which assigns a weighted average rating out of 100 to reviews from professional publications, the album received an average score of 74, based on 10 reviews. Aggregator Album of the Year gave the album 68 out of 100 based on a critical consensus of 8 reviews. In his "Consumer Guide" column, Robert Christgau found the band's latest iteration of grating avant-punk "deployed cleverly enough" and admired "the way they always come down on the right side of the divide between commitment and repeating yourself".

== Track listing ==
Goons Be Gone track listing
No.	Title	Length
1.	"Sandalwood"	2:31
2.	"Feeler"	2:40
3.	"Smoothie"	3:53
4.	"Working Stiff Takes a Break"	1:01
5.	"War Dance"	2:34
6.	"Toes in the Water"	3:11
7.	"Turned to String"	3:41
8.	"A Sigh Clicks"	2:26
9.	"Puzzled"	3:59
10.	"Head Sport Full Face"	3:55
11.	"Agitating Moss"	3:05
