= Repo (album) =

REPO

Studio album by Black Dice
- Released: 7 April 2009
- Genres: Ambient noise, electronic
- Length: 45:27
- Label: Paw Tracks

Black Dice chronology
Load Blown (2007)	REPO (2009)	Mr. Impossible (2012)

Professional ratings
Aggregate scores
Source	Rating
Metacritic	67/100
Review scores
Source	Rating
Gigwise.com	4.0/5 stars
Pitchfork	7.1/10
Slant Magazine	3.5/5 stars

Repo is the fifth studio album by American experimental noise band Black Dice. It was released on April 7, 2009, by Paw Tracks Records.

== Track listing ==
1. "Night Creme" - 5:31
2. "Glazin" - 3:51
3. "Earnings Plus Interest" - 2:22
4. "Whirligig" - 0:21
5. "La Cucaracha" - 6:59
6. "Idiots Pasture" - 2:03
7. "Lazy TV" - 5:06
8. "Buddy" - 0:34
9. "Ten Inches" - 2:03
10. "Chicken Shit" - 4:01
11. "Vegetable" - 2:50
12. "Urban Supermist" - 1:22
13. "Ultra Vomit Craze" - 6:37
14. "Gag Shack" - 1:51
