= Get Hurt (EP) =

EP by No Age
- Released: March 26, 2007
- Recorded: Gaucho Los Angeles
- Genre: Experimental rock Noise rock
- Label: Upset The Rhythm

No Age chronology
Get Hurt (2007)	Dead Plane (2007)

Get Hurt is a 12" vinyl EP released by L.A.-based band No Age on Upset the Rhythm on March 26, 2007. It was recorded at the Gaucho Los Angeles studio by Mr. Bermudez. It has six songs and is on sky blue, green, or white vinyl. It is one of five vinyl-only singles and EPs all of which were released on different labels on the same day, March 26, 2007. Song two, "Switches," features David Scott Stone. "Everybody's Down," "Neck Escapah" (as "Neck Escaper"), and "I Wanna Sleep" were all re-released as part of No Age's debut album Weirdo Rippers, which collects the highlights of all 5 singles and EPs.

== Track listing ==
Side one:

1. "Everybody's Down"
2. "Switches"
3. "Get Hurt"

Side two:

1. "Neck Escapah"
2. "Great Faces"
3. "I Wanna Sleep"
