= Routines in the Night =

Twenty One Pilots song

Song by Twenty One Pilots

from the album Clancy
- Released: May 24, 2024
- Recorded: 2021–2024
- Length: 3:22
- Label: Fueled by Ramen; Elektra
- Songwriters: Tyler Joseph; Paul Meany; Jake Torrey
- Producers: Tyler Joseph; Paul Meany

Music video
- "Routines in the Night" on YouTube

"Routines in the Night" is a song by American musical duo Twenty One Pilots, released on May 24, 2024, as the fifth track on their seventh studio album, Clancy. It was sent to Alternative Airplay as a promotional single in late 2024. The song was written by Tyler Joseph, Paul Meany and Jake Torrey.

== Background ==
Initially, frontman Tyler Joseph didn't want to include "Routines in the Night" on Clancy. Drummer Josh Dun championed for the song's inclusion due to it being one of his favorites.

=== Music ===
"Routines in the Night" features frontman Tyler Joseph singing in a more laid-back, nonchalant style. The song contains subtle vocal mannerisms that pays homage to "The Run and Go", a track from Vessel (2013).

== Music video ==
A music video for "Routines in the Night", directed by the band's creative director Mark C. Eshleman, was uploaded to YouTube on the day of Clancy's release.

== Live performances ==
Twenty One Pilots performed "Routines in the Night" on The Tonight Show Starring Jimmy Fallon on September 19, 2024. The performance was reminiscent of the song's official music video, featuring Joseph walking through various sections of the studio before making it to the stage near the end of the song. Dun appears on various drum kits in each of the rooms seamlessly.

The band released a "Concert Film" on October 30, 2024, which includes clips from three of their Clancy World Tour concerts. Joseph works his way through the crowd throughout the video before making his way back to the stage near the end.

== Personnel ==
All credits are adapted from Clancy's liner notes.

=== Twenty One Pilots ===
- Tyler Joseph – vocals, programming, samples, bass, piano, keyboards, production
- Josh Dun – drums, drum engineering

=== Additional personnel ===
- Paul Meany – production, programming, backing vocals
- Adam Hawkins – mixing
- Joe LaPorta – mastering
- Mark C. Eshleman – video director
- Jake Torrey – songwriting
- Nathan Bielski – video producer

== Charts ==
Chart performance for "Routines in the Night"
| Chart (2024) | Peak position |
|---|---|
| New Zealand Hot Singles (RMNZ) | 7 |
| US Alternative Airplay (Billboard) | 19 |
| US Hot Rock & Alternative Songs (Billboard) | 26 |
