= Mr. Impossible (album) =

Studio album by Black Dice
- Released: 10 April 2012
- Genre: Experimental, noise, electronic
- Length: 46:00
- Label: Ribbon Music

Black Dice chronology
Repo (2009)	Mr. Impossible (2012)

Professional ratings
Aggregate scores
Source	Rating
Metacritic	62/100
Review scores
Source	Rating
AllMusic	3.5/5 stars
The A.V. Club	B−
Consequence of Sound	C+
Loud and Quiet	1/10 link
NME	3/5 stars
Pitchfork	7.7/10
PopMatters	4/10
Spin	7/10
Tiny Mix Tapes	2.5/5 marks
XLR8R	7/10

Mr. Impossible is the sixth studio album by New York-based American experimental noise band Black Dice. It was released on April 10, 2012, on Ribbon Music.

== Track listing ==
1. "Pinball Wizard" - 5:10
2. "Rodriguez" - 4:21
3. "The Jacker" - 4:23
4. "Pigs" - 3:27
5. "Spy Vs. Spy" - 4:43
6. "Outer Body Drifter" - 5:37
7. "Shithouse Drifter" - 4:12
8. "Carnitas" - 8:17
9. "Brunswick Sludge (Meets Front Range Tripper)" - 5:50
