= Load Blown =

Studio album by Black Dice
- Released: 23 October 2007
- Genre: Ambient noise, electronic
- Length: 46:15
- Label: Paw Tracks

Black Dice chronology
Broken Ear Record (2005)	Load Blown (2007)	REPO (2009)

Professional ratings
Aggregate scores
Source	Rating
Metacritic	72/100 link
Review scores
Source	Rating
Pitchfork Media	(7.8/10) link
Time Off	link

Load Blown is the fourth studio album by American experimental noise band Black Dice. It was released on 23 October 2007 on Paw Tracks Records. The album consists of tracks previously issued as limited edition vinyl releases over an 18-month period: the three-track "Manoman" 12" on DFA Records, the "Roll Up/Drool" 12" on Paw Tracks, and the five-track Load Blown 12" EP.

The album received favorable reviews, with Pitchfork describing it as a "new take on Black Dice's idiosyncratic mix, where attention to detail, openness to possibility, and intuitive senses of rhythm and timing all collide."

== Track listing ==
1. "Kokomo" - 3:35
2. "Roll Up" - 7:10
3. "Gore" - 4:12
4. "Bottom Feeder" - 2:50
5. "Scavenger" - 5:16
6. "Drool" - 5:51
7. "Toka Toka" - 4:07
8. "Cowboy Soundcheck" - 1:49
9. "Bananas" - 4:36
10. "Manoman" - 6:49
