= Broken Ear Record =

Studio album by Black Dice
- Released: 6 September 2005
- Recorded: March – April 2005
- Genre: Ambient noise, electronic
- Length: 33:53
- Label: DFA
- Producer: Steve Revitte

Black Dice chronology
Creature Comforts (2004)	Broken Ear Record (2005)	Load Blown (2007)

Professional ratings
Aggregate scores
Source	Rating
Metacritic	70/100
Review scores
Source	Rating
AllMusic	4/5 stars
Pitchfork Media	(8.1/10)

Broken Ear Record is a studio album by American experimental noise band Black Dice. It was released on September 6, 2005, on DFA Records. "Smiling Off" was released as a single.

== Track listing ==
1. "Snarly Yow" – 8:14
2. "Smiling Off" – 4:21
3. "Heavy Manners" – 4:12
4. "ABA" – 0:56
5. "Street Dude" – 7:07
6. "Twins" – 2:04
7. "Motorcycle" – 6:59

== Personnel ==
Eric Copeland – vocals, electronics, percussion

Aaron Warren – electronics, vocals, percussion

Bjorn Copeland - guitar, sampler
