= Black Dice =

American experimental music group

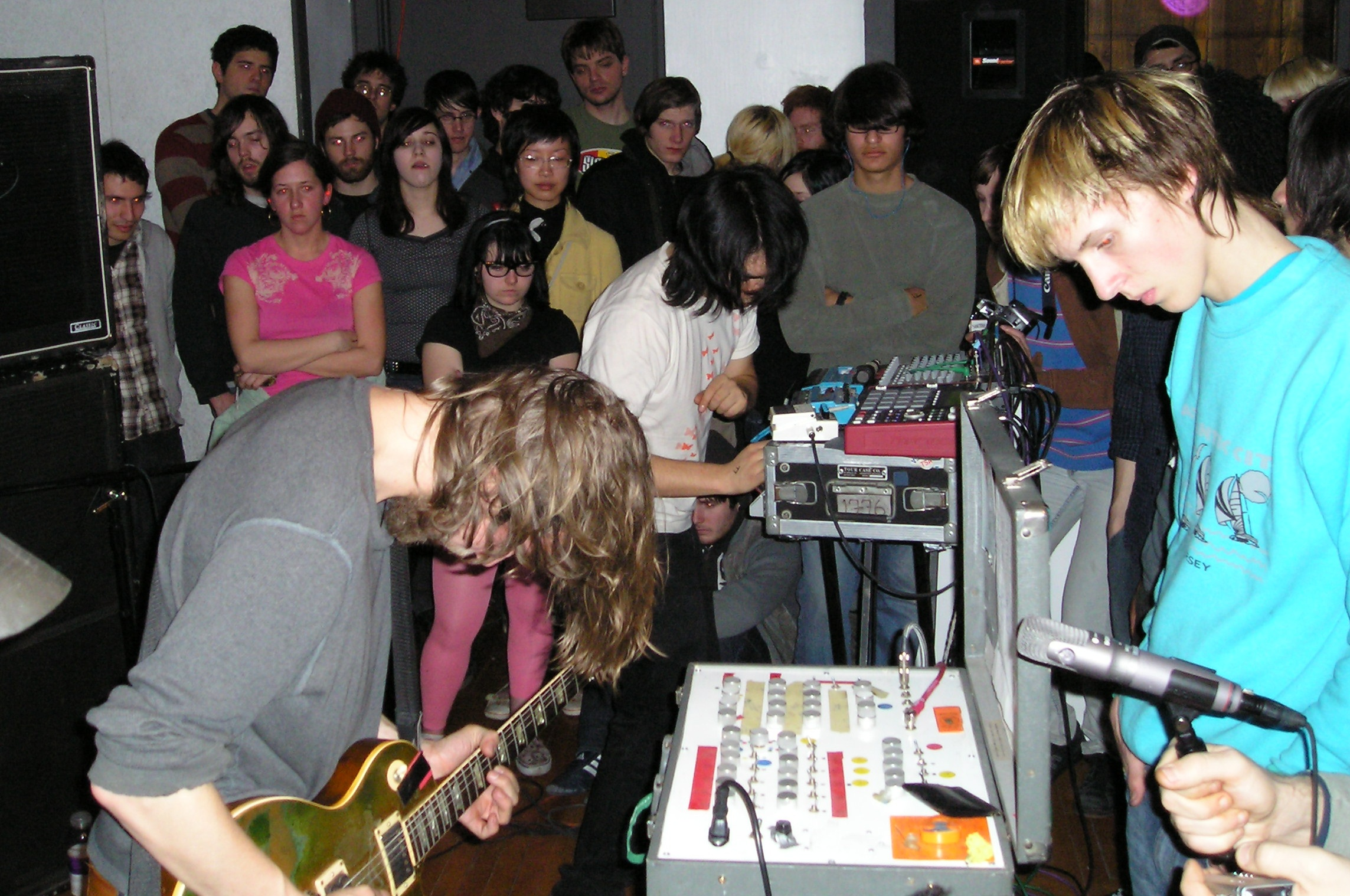
- Black Dice at MassArt in 2006

Background information
- Origin: Providence, Rhode Island, United States
- Genres: Experimental, electronic, noise, psychedelia, noise rock, hardcore punk (early)
- Years active: 1997–present
- Labels: DFA, Fat Cat, Paw Tracks, Troubleman Unlimited, Three One G
- Members: Bjorn Copeland; Eric Copeland; Aaron Warren
- Past members: Sebastian Blanck; Hisham Bharoocha
- Website: www.blackdice.net/dicemain.html

Black Dice is an American experimental noise music band based in Brooklyn, New York and consisting of brothers Bjorn and Eric Copeland along with Aaron Warren. Formed in 1997, the group was initially inspired by hardcore and noise rock, but subsequently shifted toward the extensive use of signal processing, effects units, and electronic instrumentation. They released their debut album Beaches & Canyons in 2002. They have recorded for labels such as DFA, Fat Cat, and Animal Collective's Paw Tracks.

== History ==
=== Early years ===
Black Dice formed in spring 1997 soon after guitarist Bjorn Copeland met drummer Hisham Bharoocha and bassist Sebastian Blanck when they were students at the Rhode Island School of Design. Eric Copeland (vocals) was still attending high school in Maine and would visit on weekends. Early shows seldom lasted more than fifteen minutes and were characterized by violent performances where injuries were often sustained by the band and audience alike. Live sets mixed structured songs with improvised sound manipulation, and shows differed from night to night. Later joined by Bjorn's brother Eric Copeland on vocals, their early sound has been described by Tiny Mix Tapes as thrash-influenced noise. They released several 7"s and embarked on a few brief tours before Blanck left the group.

=== Move to New York ===
In the summer of 1998 the band relocated to New York City where Eric Copeland was attending college. At an early New York performance the band met current member Aaron Warren who had recently moved from Los Angeles to attend NYU. They then began to experiment with their sound. While their earlier sound can be described as a mix of early-eighties-inspired thrash and harsh noise, the band has changed their music with each record and era of performance, Eric Copeland has stated about the band "We definitely have eras; we have records that feel like they indicate all the songs we were playing at that time.". and Bjorn has said that it's always been a very gradual progression for the bands evolution of sound stating "To be honest, I think we've been in this weird in-between space the entire length of the band. There will be these moments where people can identify really strongly to this one (sound)... Once it got kind of weird, the kids that were into hardcore really didn't like it.".

The band began incorporating more pedals into their setup and slowly leaving their earlier hardcore-leaning style in favor of more rhythmic music similar to motorik and dub music. Eric Copeland describes this transition as "...it stopped being thrashy and started being more sounds instead of songs." "Our shows used to be "all songs." Then it would be songs with these long transitions between things, instead of just flat or silent. When Aaron came along, we got better at that stuff, and that became more what we wanted to play. Playing the songs became secondary."

It was around that time that the emphasis shifted from conventional song structures to more open-ended sonic investigations. Shows of this era maintained an equally physical presence through the use of high volume levels and an extreme range of frequencies, and violent performance became less frequent. The music bore more resemblance to crude first generation industrial music or contemporary power electronics than straight noise or hardcore. Eric describes this era as "we were like heavy noise dudes, and it got a lot of industrial people would ask 'Oh, you guys to listen to Whitehouse?'"

Warren recounts when he lived in Los Angeles, "I remember seeing like Merzbow and stuff when he was just doing all pedals, and that was the first time I had ever seen a performance with no guitars, no keyboards, no anything. When I saw Masonna, he just had a coin purse, a microphone, and stacks behind him. That was a revolutionary musical experience for me, but I still played guitar for five years after that, and sang, and it never occurred to me to that that was something I was going to do."

By the fall of 2001, live shows had grown in length to almost five or six times of the earlier sets, with the occasional song reaching 45 minutes. An emphasis on signal processing provided a broader sonic palette. While volume and physical presence of sound remained crucial, melody and repetition became key compositional elements. During this time, the band recorded with post-industrial/noise band Wolf Eyes initially meeting them because they wanted to book a show in Michigan and Wolf Eyes member John Olson booked them in his basement. The brothers recall recording with Wolf Eyes in an interview for Tiny Mix Tapes "We probably burned through like $100 worth of grass... On the first day!".

=== DFA and Fat Cat years ===
Four months after recording with Wolf Eyes they would record Beaches and Canyons. The release of the album Beaches and Canyons on DFA/Fat Cat and its follow-up, 2004's Creature Comforts, saw the band reaching a worldwide audience. The album would later be ranked by Pitchfork Media as number 97 of The Top 100 Albums of 2000–04. It was during this time the band was interviewed and filmed in performance for Scott Crary's documentary Kill Your Idols, along with bands like Yeah Yeah Yeahs and Liars.

In spring of 2004, the band parted ways with long-time drummer and friend Hisham Bharoocha. The band was set back with the departure of Bharoocha and their cancellation of a heavily planned tour co-headlined by their friends Animal Collective. Nonetheless, reduced to a trio, Black Dice recorded Broken Ear Record in Australia in early 2005. Without a drummer, their music took another turn towards Afrobeat and breakbeat. Metamorphosed once again, Black Dice emerged as a tight compositional unit, with little emphasis remaining on improvisation or long-form songs. A near-pop sensibility was embraced, with shorter and catchier tunes. Also in 2004, the band's song "Skeleton" was featured in HBO's documentary Thinking XXX. Though they were not included in the film's soundtrack the song is listed in the film's credits.

In summer 2005, the group released its first non-music object; a 128-page book of collage art made in collaboration with photographer Jason Frank Rothenberg.

=== Paw Tracks years ===
After their contract with DFA/Fat Cat was over, Black Dice took the remaining DFA material in 2007 and released it as Load Blown on the Animal Collective label Paw Tracks. The band made their first music video, a visual mash up of images culled from television and the Internet featuring the single “Kokomo” off the album. In 2009 the band released their fifth studio album Repo.

Visual art has been a key counterpart to the music, with all record-sleeve design made by band members. Artists Ara Peterson and Danny Perez have made videos for songs, and Mr. Perez has contributed a live video mix to the band's live set since fall of 2005, Perez would later direct ODDSAC with Animal Collective supplying the music. Animal Collective member Noah Lennox said about Black Dice in an interview with The Milk Factory in 2005: "[...] I feel like the wisest things I’ve learned about being in a band I learned by watching them." In early 2009, he confirmed in an interview with Magic that he looks to Black Dice "as a model for a band. [...] I feel like as a band, I can't speak for the other guys [of Animal Collective], but certainly for myself, like I modelled the way I approach to everything with the band watching the way Black Dice did it."

=== Ribbon Music and Mr. Impossible ===
Black Dice returned with their sixth studio album Mr. Impossible, released April 10, 2012, on Ribbon Music. The release of the album was preceded by the single and video for the track "Pigs".

== Members ==
Current

- Bjorn Copeland – guitar, custom sequencer/effects box, sampler, electronics (1997–present)
- Eric Copeland – vocals, sampler, delays, electronics, percussion (1997–present)
- Aaron Warren – electronics, sampler, bass sounds, MPC, percussion, vocals (1999–present)

Former

- Sebastian Blanck – bass (1997–1999)
- Hisham Bharoocha – drums, electronics, vocals (1997–2004)

== Touring ==
The band has toured America and Europe dozens of times, and has visited Japan twice. Having been together over ten years, the group has performed shows in five continents sharing the stage with artists including The Residents and Godspeed You! Black Emperor. In 2005, the trio recorded an album in Byron Bay, Australia following a tour. In 2006, the band played in Brazil and a live set was captured on national television in Lima, Peru. Virtually any and every type of venue has served as the backdrop for Black Dice shows; from basements and warehouses to art galleries and museums, from house shows to gigantic outdoor festivals or formal seated theaters.

== Discography ==
Studio albums

- Beaches & Canyons (2002), DFA / Fat Cat Records
- Creature Comforts (2004), DFA / Fat Cat Records
- Broken Ear Record (2005), DFA / EMI
- Load Blown (2007), Paw Tracks
- Repo (2009), Paw Tracks
- Mr. Impossible (2012), Ribbon Music
- Mod Prog Sic (2021), Four Four

EPs and singles

- Untitled (a.k.a. Printed Paper) (1998), Vermin Scum
- Black Dice 3 (2000)
- Cold Hands (2001), Troubleman Unlimited / Catsup Plate
- Lost Valley (2002), Catsup Plate / Tigerbeat6
- Miles of Smiles (2004), DFA / Fat Cat Records
- Smiling Off (2005), DFA/EMI
- Manoman (2006), DFA
- Load Blown (2007), Paw Tracks
- Chocolate Cherry (2009), Catsup Plate
- Rodriguez (2012), Ribbon Music
- Big Deal (2017), L.I.E.S.

Singles

- "Lambs Like Fruit" (Gravity, 1998)
- "Semen of the Sun" (Tapes, 2000)
- "Ball" / "Peace in the Valley" (31G, 2001)
- "Cone Toaster" (DFA, 2003)
- "Roll Up" / "Drool" (Paw-Tracks, 2007)
- "Big Deal" / "Last Laugh" (L.I.E.S., 2016)
- "White Sugar" (Four Four, 2021)

Splits and collaborations

- split with Erase Errata (2001), Troubleman Unlimited
- Wastered with Animal Collective (2004), Paw Tracks

With Wolf Eyes

- Chimes in Black Water 1 (2001)
- Chimes in Black Water 2 (2002)
- Black Dice & Wolf Eyes (2003)
- Chimes in Black Water 3 (2003)
