= Losing Feeling =

EP by No Age
- Released: October 6, 2009
- Recorded: May 2009
- Genre: Noise rock, noise pop
- Length: 13:19
- Label: Sub Pop

No Age chronology
Nouns (2008)	Losing Feeling (2009)	Everything In Between (2010)

Professional ratings
Aggregate scores
Source	Rating
Metacritic	(80/100)
Review scores
Source	Rating
AbsolutePunk	(77%)
Delusions of Adequacy	(8/10)
Drowned In Sound	(7/10)
Pitchfork Media	(8.3/10)
Spin	4/5 stars
The A.V. Club	(B)
Robert Christgau	(3-star Honorable Mention)

Losing Feeling is an EP by Southern Californian noise rock band No Age released by Sub Pop. It was made available for full streaming on August 5, 2009 and became available physically on October 6. The EP saw the band experimenting more with sample-based arrangements (created by looping heavily treated vocal or guitar parts) and electronic instrumentation. In comparison to their last effort Nouns, guitarist Randy Randall commented that the band was writing, "a little bit more left-field than some of the songs that were on the album." All of the songs that appear on the EP were written at the band's practice space, with "Genie" being recorded there.

Pre-orders from Insound came with a zine made by the members of the band, which features lyrics, artwork, a copy of a letter Randy Randall wrote to Sonic Youth guitarist Lee Ranaldo as a child (and the letter Lee wrote back), and newspaper photograph of Dean Allen Spunt getting arrested at a student protest. The zines shipped two months after the records as the band began to develop new projects including scoring a live soundtrack for the Jean-Jacques Annaud-directed film, The Bear and a documentary on all-ages venues.

Gil Kenan directed a video for "Losing Feeling."

== Track listing ==
1. "Losing Feeling" - 3:55
2. "Genie" - 3:25
3. "Aim at the Airport" - 3:17
4. "You're a Target" - 3:22
