= An Object =

Studio album by No Age
- Released: August 19, 2013
- Genres: Art punk, noise rock, experimental pop
- Length: 29:42
- Label: Sub Pop

No Age chronology
Everything In Between (2010)	An Object (2013)	Snares Like a Haircut (2018)

Singles from An Object
- 1. "C'mon, Stimmung" Released: July 9, 2013

Professional ratings
Aggregate scores
Source	Rating
Metacritic	73/100
Review scores
Source	Rating
AllMusic	4.5/5 stars
Consequence of Sound	3.5/5 stars
Exclaim!	8/10
Filter	87%
MSN Music (Expert Witness)	A−
NME	7/10
Paste	8.4/10
Pitchfork	6.2/10
Rolling Stone	3.5/5 stars

An Object is the third studio album from the duo No Age and third to be released through Sub Pop. The band physically created, printed, packaged, and manufactured 10,000 units of the record themselves.

== Track listing ==
No.	Title	Length
1.	"No Ground"	2:31
2.	"I Won't Be Your Generator"	3:18
3.	"C'mon, Stimmung"	3:13
4.	"Defector/ed"	3:04
5.	"An Impression"	2:30
6.	"Lock Box"	2:05
7.	"Running from A-Go-Go"	3:04
8.	"My Hands, Birch and Steel"	0:56
9.	"Circling with Dizzy"	2:20
10.	"A Ceiling Dreams of a Floor"	2:35
11.	"Commerce, Comment, Commence"	4:03

== Personnel ==
- Randy Randall - Composer
- Dean Spunt - Composer
- Facundo Bermudez - Producer, Engineer
- Pete Lyman - Mastering
- Isaac Takeuchi - Cello
