= Eraser (No Age song) =

Single by No Age

from the album Nouns
- Released: April 8, 2008
- Genre: Experimental rock, noise rock
- Label: Sub Pop
- Songwriters: Randy Randall, Dean Allen Spunt

No Age singles chronology
"Liars + No Age" (2008)	"Eraser" (2008)	"Goat Hurt" (2008)

"Eraser" is the first single from Los Angeles-based band No Age's second album, Nouns. It was released on Sub Pop on April 8, 2008 on the 7" Single format. It features 4 tracks, of which only one is an original song. According to Pitchfork Media, the covers came about when the band were trapped in their car during a snowstorm for 14 hours. During that time, they taught themselves to play the songs.

== Track listing ==
1. "Eraser" - 2:43
2. "Don't Stand Still" (Nate Denver's Neck cover) - 2:12
3. "Male Masturbation" (Urinals cover) - 1:29
4. "When You Find Out" (The Nerves cover) - 2:07

== In popular culture ==
In 2017, the single's titular song "Eraser" appeared in the Canadian sitcom Letterkenny, as background music for a bar fight, in season 4 episode 1 "Never Work A Day In Your Life."
