= Balu Brigada =

New Zealand alt-pop band

- Origin: Auckland, New Zealand
- Genres: Indie rock alt-pop
- Years active: 2016–present
- Labels: Warner Music Australia; Atlantic; ARRO
- Members: Henry Beasley; Pierre Beasley; Harper Finn (keyboard); Jacob Stockman (drums)
- Past members: Charles Beasley; Guy Harrison
- Website: balu-brigada.com

Balu Brigada is a New Zealand indie rock band originally from Auckland. The act, formed in 2016 with four members, is led by multi-instrumentalist brothers Henry and Pierre Beasley. They have released two extended plays—I Should Be Home (2022), and Find a Way (2023)—and the compilation Balu (2024). Their debut album, Portal, was released on 29 August 2025.

== History ==
Balu Brigada was formed in 2016. Originally the band was named Baloo, an homage to the character of the same name from the Disney film The Jungle Book. However, fearing legal troubles from Disney, the band was renamed to Balu Brigada. The band's first lineup had four members: Henry Beasley as the lead singer and guitarist, his older brother Charles as the drummer, his younger brother Pierre on keyboards, and their childhood friend, Guy Harrison, on bass. Sometimes, Pierre was not allowed to play in certain venues since he was only 15. Their first two singles were "Weekend" and "Ricochet". They started focusing more on writing and production after Pierre came of age. Charles Beasley and Harrison left over the next several years, leading Henry and Pierre Beasley to adopt multi-instrumentalist and dual vocalist roles.

In September 2022, Balu Brigada signed with Warner Music Australia and Atlantic Records in their first deal as joint partners. The band announced their signing alongside their first release under their new labels, debut EP I Should Be Home. The EP addresses issues from "messy break-ups to drunken epiphanies" navigated by an inexperienced "20-something". The band relocated from Auckland to New York City following the signing.

In July 2023, Balu Brigada released their sophomore EP Find a Way. The track list includes viral songs "Designer" and "2Good". Spanning multiple genres, the six-track record has been described by the band as "about tripping up on all the subtleties of the dating game". It spurred them back to New Zealand and Australia to tour.

Balu Brigada opened for Twenty One Pilots on the U.S. leg of the Clancy World Tour, which began in August 2024. Henry and Pierre Beasley were then joined by Harper Finn on the keys and Jacob Stockman on the drums. The four-piece returned for the Australia and New Zealand leg, concluding in November of the same year, and also supported the duo on the Latin America and Europe & UK legs in 2025. The New Zealand Herald's reviewer was appreciative of their Auckland performance, writing that their "catchy alt-pop riffs and endearing charm no doubt earned them plenty more fans in their hometown."

In October 2024, Balu Brigada announced the Can't Be Your Dog Tour, their first headlining tour. It took place in February and March 2025, spanning four shows across the U.S. They performed at "The Echo" in Los Angeles, CA on February 27, "The Rickshaw Shop" in San Francisco, CA on 1 March, "Schubas Tavern" in Chicago, IL on 3 March, and "Baby's All Right" in Brooklyn, NY on 6 March. This tour had minimal capacities, the biggest capacity being a capacity of 400 at "The Echo" and the smallest being a capacity of 165 at "Schubas Tavern."

In January 2025, Balu Brigada was named one of SiriusXM's Future Five artists for 2025.

On February 28, the band performed at an additional show at "No Vacancy" in Los Angeles that was part of Booker and Stryker's "Friday Night Out."

On March 5, 2025, Balu Brigada made their live television debut on Jimmy Kimmel Live!, and performed "So Cold".

In May 2025, Balu Brigada announced their debut album, Portal, released on 29 August 2025, along with the release of the album's third single "Backseat". The album was written and entirely produced by both members whilst on the road touring. Alongside this, the Portal Tour was announced, which began at Mexico City in October, and concluded at Austin, Texas in November. The album's fourth single, "What Do We Ever Really Know?" was released on 24 July, and the fifth single, "Politix", was released on 19 August. The sixth and the last single, "Sideways", was released on 27 August, two days prior to the release date of the album.

In late 2025, Balu Brigada announced Portal Tour to be brought to Europe in April and May 2026, and an Australasia Tour in Australia and New Zealand for June 2026.

== Discography ==
=== Albums ===
List of albums, with selected details
Title	Details	Peak chart positions
Title	Details	AUS
Portal	Released: 29 August 2025; Label: Atlantic / Warner Australia / ARRO	81

=== Extended plays ===
List of EPs, with selected details
Title	Details
Almost Feel Good Mixtape	Released: 24 May 2019; Label: Balu Brigada
I Should Be Home	Released: 23 September 2022; Label: Atlantic / Warner Australia
Find a Way	Released: 28 July 2023; Label: Atlantic / Warner Australia
Balu	Released: 14 August 2024; Label: Atlantic / Warner Australia

=== Singles ===
Title	Year	Peak chart positions				Album
Title	Year	NZ Hot	LTU Air.	US Alt.	US Air.	Album
"So Cold"	2024	—	—	1	7	Portal
"The Question"	2025	—	—	—	—	Portal
"Learn to Let You Go"	2025	—	—	—	—	Non-album single
"Backseat"	2025	19	88	7	21	Portal
"What Do We Ever Really Know?"	2025	—	—	—	—	Portal
"Politix"	2025	—	—	—	—	Portal
"Sideways"	2025	20	—	—	—	Portal
"BedHead"	2026	—	—	—	—	
