= Next Semester =

Twenty One Pilots song

Single by Twenty One Pilots

from the album Clancy
- Released: March 27, 2024
- Recorded: 2023
- Genre: Pop rock; pop-punk; post-punk; garage rock
- Length: 3:54
- Label: Fueled by Ramen
- Songwriter: Tyler Joseph
- Producers: Tyler Joseph; Paul Meany

Twenty One Pilots singles chronology
"Overcompensate" (2024)	"Next Semester" (2024)	"Backslide" (2024)

Music video
- "Next Semester" on YouTube

"Next Semester" is a song by American musical duo Twenty One Pilots, released on March 27, 2024, through Fueled by Ramen as the second single of their seventh studio album, Clancy, and was produced by Tyler Joseph and Paul Meany.

The song was accompanied by a music video directed by Andrew Donoho. On the same day, the band announced the Clancy World Tour.

== Composition ==
"Next Semester" has been described as pop rock, pop-punk, post-punk, and garage rock. Theme wise, the song is considered to be a restless blast about wanting to begin again while still contending with what was in the past, containing lyrics that speak about the feeling of anxiety and an inescapable memory of standing in the road, in front of a moving vehicle, and escaping from being run over. According to Joseph, the song is "about a panic attack [he had] in college." The title alludes to the idea of starting fresh next semester.

== Release ==
Following days of speculation, "Next Semester" was officially announced on March 23, 2024. The band stated the song would be released "next week" and provided a teaser of the music video. The track, along with the music video, became available on March 27, 2024.

== Music video ==
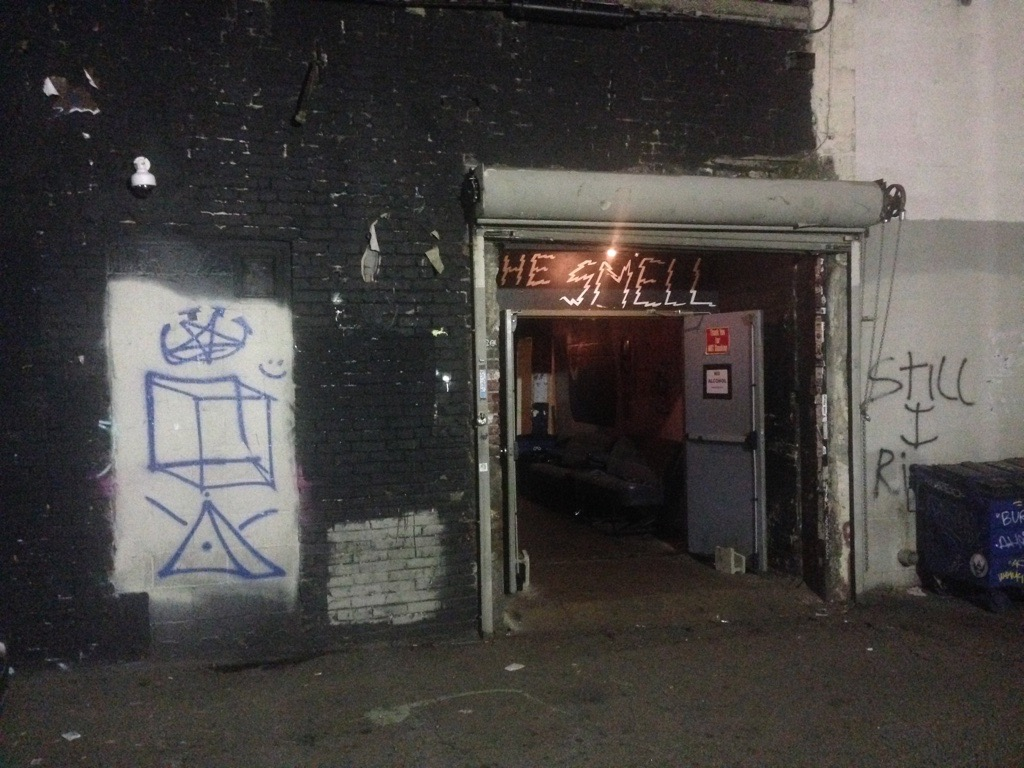
The music video for "Next Semester" was filmed at The Smell.

On March 17, 2024, the music video was filmed at The Smell in downtown Los Angeles. The music video for "Next Semester" was directed by Andrew Donoho with editing by Mark C. Eshleman and Tyler Joseph. As of January 28, 2026, it has garnered over 15 million views on YouTube. On April 17, 2024, the band released a behind-the-scenes video.

The video features the band performing the song in front of a crowd. The video consistently switches between shots of the concert and Joseph standing in the middle of a dimly lit road at night, presumably seen from the point-of-view of an oncoming vehicle.

== Usage in media ==
"Next Semester" is featured in the video game Fortnite as a Jam Track.

== Personnel ==
Credits adapted from Twenty One Pilots' official YouTube channel.

Twenty One Pilots

- Tyler Joseph – vocals, bass, piano, synthesizers, programming, songwriting, production, ukulele
- Josh Dun – drums

Additional personnel

- Paul Meany – programming, production
- Adam Hawkins – mixing
- Joe LaPorta – mastering

== Charts ==
Chart performance for "Next Semester"
Chart (2024)	Peak position
Czech Republic Airplay (ČNS IFPI)	33
New Zealand Hot Singles (RMNZ)	23
US Hot Rock & Alternative Songs (Billboard)	22
