= In Full Bloom =

In Full Bloom may refer to:

- In Full Bloom (Rose Royce album), 1977
- In Full Bloom (The Marvelettes album), 1969
- In Full Bloom (film), a 2021 American neo-noir sports drama film
