= Backslide (song) =

Twenty One Pilots song

Single by Twenty One Pilots

from the album Clancy
- Released: April 25, 2024
- Genre: Hip hop; rap rock
- Length: 3:00
- Label: Fueled by Ramen
- Songwriter: Tyler Joseph
- Producers: Tyler Joseph; Paul Meany

Twenty One Pilots singles chronology
"Next Semester" (2024)	"Backslide" (2024)	"The Craving" (2024)

Music video
- "Backslide" on YouTube

"Backslide" is a song by American musical duo Twenty One Pilots, released on April 25, 2024, through Fueled by Ramen as the third single of their seventh studio album, Clancy. The song was written by Tyler Joseph and produced by him and Paul Meany.

== Composition ==
"Backslide" is a mid-tempo hip hop and rap rock song.

== Music video ==
The music video for "Backslide" was uploaded to YouTube on the day of release. It is directed by Josh Dun, the drummer of the duo, in his directorial debut. The video features Tyler Joseph purchasing hamburger buns from a convenience store before rapping and singing while riding a bicycle down a suburban street. He stops halfway to buy a cup of lemonade from a stand, using one of the buns as currency. While he is riding, the buns get continuously more damaged and soiled from rain storms before he arrives at the front of Dun's house, realizing that he now needs to return to the convenience store once more, and alluding to an ongoing cycle. As of April 25, 2026, the video has garnered over 13 million views.

== Personnel ==
Twenty One Pilots

- Tyler Joseph
- Josh Dun

Technical

- Paul Meany – producer
- Tyler Joseph – producer, executive producer, songwriting
- Chris Woltman – executive producer
- Joe LaPorta – masterer
- Adam Hawkins – mixer

== Charts ==
Chart performance for "Backslide"
Chart (2024)	Peak position
New Zealand Hot Singles (RMNZ)	10
UK Singles (Official Charts)	99
US Hot Rock & Alternative Songs (Billboard)	21
