= Otis Houston Jr. =

American artist (born 1954)

- Born: 1954 (age 71–72); Greenville, South Carolina, U.S.
- Occupation: Artist

Otis Houston Jr. (born 1954 in Greenville, South Carolina, U.S.) is a New York based artist, known for installing and performing his work in public along FDR Drive in Manhattan. Houston sometimes presents his work as Black Cherokee.

== Early life ==
Houston grew up in Greenville, South Carolina, and moved to New York in 1969. He served seven years in prison on several drug charges. During his incarceration, Houston developed his art practice.

== Art practice ==
Houston has been performing in public along FDR Drive at 122nd St, since 1997. His work typically takes form as performance (often spoken word), sculpture, and text-based pieces. His sculptures employ found materials collected in his apartment building or where he works, including towels, chairs, and doors. During the day, he works as a custodian in an office building.

== Exhibitions ==
Houston has exhibited his work at several New York galleries, including Canada, Room East, and Gordon Robichaux, where he is represented. He has also shown at Socrates Sculpture Park. Houston opened his first institutional exhibition at the John Michael Kohler Arts Center in October 2022.
