= The Craving (song) =

Twenty One Pilots song

Single by Twenty One Pilots
- Released: May 22, 2024
- Length: 2:53
- Songwriter: Tyler Joseph
- Producers: Tyler Joseph; Paul Meany; Spencer Stewart

Twenty One Pilots singles chronology
"Backslide" (2024)	"The Craving" (2024)	"The Line" (2024)

Music video
- "The Craving" (Single Version) on YouTube

"The Craving (Jenna's Version)"

Song by Twenty One Pilots

from the album Clancy
- Released: May 24, 2024
- Length: 2:54
- Songwriter: Tyler Joseph
- Producers: Tyler Joseph; Paul Meany

Music video
- "The Craving (Jenna's Version)" on YouTube

"The Craving" is a song by American musical duo Twenty One Pilots, released on May 22, 2024, through Fueled by Ramen as the fourth and final single from their seventh studio album, Clancy. Two different versions of the song were released by the band with differing arrangements and production, with one released as a promotional single and the other, subtitled "Jenna's Version", being released on the album itself.

== Background ==
On May 9, 2024, the duo debuted "The Craving" to a live audience at an intimate show in London. The song would eventually be released in two versions, both differing in production and in instrumental arrangement. The "(Single Version)" is up-beat with more instruments and additional production by Spencer Stewart; the album cut "(Jenna's Version)" is an acoustic and stripped-back version of the song.

== Composition ==
"The Craving" was written by lead singer Tyler Joseph as a dedication to his wife, Jenna Joseph. Since 2015, every Twenty One Pilots album has had a love ballad to Jenna, with "The Craving" being the fourth following "Tear in My Heart", "Smithereens", and "Formidable".

== Charts ==
=== Weekly charts ===
Weekly chart performance for "The Craving"
Chart (2024)	Peak position
Canada Modern Rock (Billboard Canada)	5
Canada Rock (Billboard)	24
Global 200 (Billboard)	151
UK Singles (OCC)	66
US Billboard Hot 100	83
US Adult Pop Airplay (Billboard)	20
US Hot Rock & Alternative Songs (Billboard)	20
US Pop Airplay (Billboard)	26
US Rock & Alternative Airplay (Billboard)	8

=== Year-end charts ===
2024 Year-end chart performance for "The Craving"
Chart (2024)	Position
US Hot Rock & Alternative Songs (Billboard)	81
US Rock Airplay (Billboard)	35

2025 Year-end chart performance for "The Craving"
Chart (2025)	Position
Canada Modern Rock (Billboard)	36
