= Crush (Abe Vigoda album) =

Studio album by Abe Vigoda
- Released: September 20, 2010
- Length: 40:00
- Labels: Bella Union, PPM

Professional ratings
Aggregate scores
Source	Rating
Metacritic	(74/100)
Review scores
Source	Rating
AllMusic	4/5 stars
The A.V. Club	B−
Spin	6/10 stars
Stuck On An Island	(?)
Pitchfork	(7.8/10)

Crush is the fourth LP by Abe Vigoda. It was released on Bella Union and Post Present Medium on September 20, 2010. Pitchfork Media placed it at number 40 on its list "The Top 50 Albums of 2010".

== Track listing ==
1. "Sequins" - 4:20
2. "Dream of My Love (Chasing After You)" – 4:17
3. "Throwing Shade" – 3:35
4. "Crush" – 4:35
5. "November" - 2:51
6. "Pure Violence" – 3:44
7. "Repeating Angel" – 6:07
8. "To Tears" – 3:16
9. "Beverly Slope" - 3:15
10. "We Have to Mask" – 4:36
