= No Age =

American noise rock band

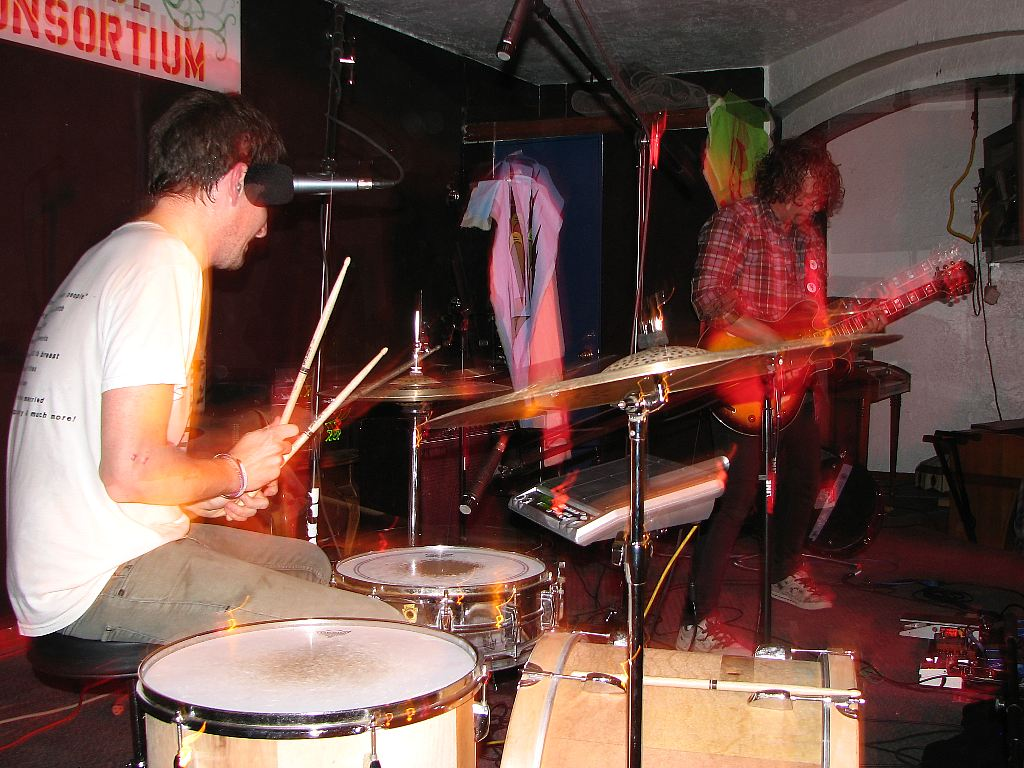
- No Age performing live in Albuquerque

Background information
- Origin: Los Angeles, California, United States
- Genres: Noise rock; art punk; noise pop
- Years active: 2005–present
- Labels: FatCat; Sub Pop; Post Present Medium; Drag City
- Members: Randy Randall; Dean Allen Spunt
- Website: bio.site/noage

No Age is an American noise rock duo consisting of guitarist Randy Randall and drummer/vocalist Dean Allen Spunt. The band is based in Los Angeles, California, and was signed to Sub Pop records from 2008 to 2013. No Age's fourth studio album, Snares Like a Haircut, was released by Drag City on January 26, 2018. Drag City also released Goons Be Gone, their fifth studio album, on June 5, 2020, and their sixth studio album People Helping People in 2022.

== History ==
=== Formation, EPs, and Weirdo Rippers ===
No Age formed in December 2005. Previously, Spunt had played bass and sung in Wives, alongside Randall on guitar. They played their first show at the New Image Art gallery for a show curated by friend and artist Rich Jacobs on January 22, 2006. Their second show was at The Smell in April 2006 with Mika Miko, BARR and more. "The Smell is where we got to experiment. It pushed the boundaries of whatever ideas we had about music and art—and we had a community to try out these new ideas," Randall told Drew Tewksbury in 2008. The band recorded 5 limited edition vinyl singles and EPs, and released them on 5 different labels on or around the same day, March 26, 2007. Designed by Brian Roettinger, Randall and Spunt, the back of each record's sleeve was a different color, and had one of the letters that, when you collected all of them, would join to spell "No Age." Half of the songs off these 5 EPs and singles were collected and released in album form under the title Weirdo Rippers, on June 11, 2007, through FatCat Records. The cover featured the exterior back wall of The Smell painted No Age and, below, Weirdo Rippers by Amanda Vietta, an artist and friend of No Age. The painting of The Smell can also be seen in the band's first music video for the song "Boy Void". No Age are known for their constant touring, community allegiance and playing un-traditional venues, such as their show at the Los Angeles River. A New Yorker article on the band from November 19, 2007, entitled Let It Rip earned them much acclaim and fans.

=== Sub Pop, touring, and Nouns ===
Buoyed by positive reviews in the music press, No Age signed to the prominent Seattle-based independent label Sub Pop. On January 25, 2008, No Age began a month-long, 23-date tour with New York City band Liars. Liars and No Age also released a joint 7-inch single limited to 1200 copies to coincide with the tour. 200 copies of the two-song single were sold on tour, with unique cover art for each individual city designed by Brian Roettinger, and the other 1000 featured hand letterpress-printed covers with different ink and vinyl color for each one. On May 6, 2008, No Age released their debut record for Sub Pop, Nouns. No Age appeared in an episode of VBS.tv "Practice Space," showing their Bushwick, New York practice space, which was inside of a wood shop. In May 2008, UK music magazine Mojo named No Age one of the top ten best new acts, beside Bon Iver and Sub Pop labelmates Fleet Foxes. Randall and Spunt, along with Roettinger were nominated for a Grammy for their design and packaging of the Nouns CD, which came with a 64-page book of art and photos.

The music video for No Age's song "Eraser" directed by Andy Bruntel debuted on June 27, 2008. The video begins with No Age's instrumental song "Impossible Bouquet" from Nouns, before it segues into "Eraser".

A No Age music video for the song "Goat Hurt" is included on a DVD entitled New Video Works released by Dean Spunt's label, Post Present Medium. The song is off of the band's out of print Dead Plane EP, but was also available through a limited edition 10-inch EP made available at the Fuck Yeah! festival held in L.A. on August 30, 2008. The video was directed by Mika Miko's Jennifer Clavin.

=== Losing Feeling, Everything in Between ===
The group released the 4 song EP Losing Feeling on October 6, 2009, on Sub Pop. The release had a companion zine called "Losing Feeling" made by the band and Brian Roettinger that was for sale with pre-orders and also at art book stores Ooga Booga in Los Angeles and Printed Matter, Inc. in New York. The zine was in an edition of 200.

On April 1, 2010, No Age performed a Live Score at the REDCAT in Los Angeles for the film Aanteni directed by Todd Cole for the fashion designers Rodarte. The film includes original No Age music.

On June 24, 2010, No Age announced their new album, Everything in Between, along with the track listing. On July 28, No Age premiered the first single from the album, "Glitter", on a BBC 6 Music interview with Steve Lamacq. On August 10, the album's cover was released, and plans to release two "Glitter" singles were announced, along with their respective covers. The singles were released on August 24. Everything In Between was released on September 28, 2010, to generally favorable reviews.

During June 16–20, 2011, No Age accompanied video artist Doug Aitken and actress Chloë Sevigny to Athens and Hydra Island in Greece to perform the multimedia installation piece Black Mirror. Supported by the Deste Foundation and the Greek Festival the performances took place on an old Greek barge at the Port of Piraeus in Athens on June 16 and 17 and off the Island of Hydra on June 19. With a final performance on June 20 with the barge driven a mile off the coast of Hydra in the middle of the ocean.

On November 12, 2011, No Age made a soundtrack and installation piece for Hedi Slimane's California Song at the MOCA Pacific Design Center. They performed their piece with audience participation for the opening of the show and the soundtrack as a continuous loop played for the duration of the show ending on January 22, 2012.

No Age released An Object on August 19, 2013, on Sub Pop.

On January 26, 2018, they released their fourth album on Drag City, entitled, Snares Like a Haircut.

On February 24, 2020, they released the single, "Turned to String" and announced their fifth studio album, Goons Be Gone which was released on June 5, 2020. From the same album they released the singles "Feeler", "War Dance" and "Head Sport Full Face" prior to the release of the full album.

=== People Helping People ===
On July 6, 2022, No Age announced their album People Helping People with a September 16 release date alongside the release of its first single "Andy Helping Andy". It will be their first album entirely recorded by the band.

== Discography ==
=== Studio albums ===
- Nouns CD/12" (Sub Pop, 2008)
- Everything in Between CD/12" (Sub Pop, 2010)
- An Object CD/12" (Sub Pop, 2013)
- Snares Like a Haircut (Drag City, 2018)
- Goons Be Gone (Drag City, 2020)
- People Helping People (Drag City, 2022)

=== Compilation album ===
- Weirdo Rippers CD/12" (FatCat, 2007)

=== EPs ===
- DVD-R No. 1 (Self Released 2006)
- Get Hurt 12-inch (Upset The Rhythm, 2007)
- Dead Plane 12-inch (Teenage Teardrops, 2007)
- Sick People Are Safe 12-inch (Deleted Art, 2007)
- Flannel Graduate CD-r (with Zach Hill) (Self-Released, 2008)
- Goat Hurt 10-inch (2008)
- Losing Feeling 12-inch (Sub Pop, 2009)
- Collage Culture 12-inch (PPM, 2012)
- "Barely Mixed, No Master" CD-r (Self Released, 2015)

=== Singles ===
- "Neck Escaper 7-inch (Youth Attack, 2007)
- PPM 7-inch (Post Present Medium, 2007)
- Liars / No Age split 7-inch (Post Present Medium/Hand Held Heart, 2008)
- "Eraser" (Sub Pop, 2008)
- "Teen Creeps" (Sub Pop, 2008)
- "Glitter" 7-/12-inch (Sub Pop, 2010)
- "Fever Dreaming" (Sub Pop, 2010)
- Bored Fortress split 7-inch with Infinite Body (Not Not Fun, 2010)
- "C'mon, Stimmung" (Sub Pop, 2013)
- "Separation b/w Serf To Serf" 7-inch (Self Released, 2016)

=== Cassettes ===
- "Secret City"/"Brett Schultz Himself" split cassette with Abe Vigoda (Death Bomb Arc, 2007)
- Slow Gag live in Glasgow 9 October 2010 cassette (Rude Fans, 2011)
- "Untitled Green Tape" live and extended versions of songs from An Object (Self Released, 2013)
- "Re-imagined An Object" live and extended versions of songs from An Object (the Thing Quarterly, April 26, 2014).
- "Spree Snare Cuts - Live in Germany 2018" cassette (Blackjack Illuminist Records, 2018)
- "Score For The Day Before" Live score for a short film by No Age (McEvoy Foundation, 2019)
- "Vera Violence - Live in Groningen 2023" cassette (Blackjack Illuminist Records, 2023)
