= Creature Comforts (album) =

Studio album by Black Dice
- Released: June 22, 2004
- Recorded: 2001 & 2003
- Genre: Electronica; experimental; musique concrète; noise rock
- Length: 43:46
- Label: DFA

Black Dice chronology
| Beaches & Canyons (2002) | Creature Comforts (2004) | Broken Ear Record (2005) |

Professional ratings
Aggregate scores
| Source | Rating |
|---|---|
| Metacritic | 71/100 |
Review scores
| Source | Rating |
| AllMusic | 3.5/5 stars |
| Pitchfork | (8.0/10) |
| Rolling Stone | 3/5 stars |
| Tiny Mix Tapes | 5/5 marks |

Creature Comforts is the second album by American experimental noise band Black Dice. It was released in June 2004 by DFA Records (USA) and Fat Cat Records (UK).

The album, according to Kory Grow of CMJ New Music Monthly, is "Black Dice's musique concrète take on animal noises, including replicated elephant sounds, duck calls and even sparrow chirps".

== Background ==
The album was preceded by the Miles of Smiles EP in March of the same year. Most tracks were recorded at the Water Music, Rare Book Room and DFA's Plantain studios in New York City. "Live Loop" is a live-recording from the 2001 Summer Tour 2001. Both James Murphy and Tim Goldsworthy assisted with the recording while Steve Revitte mixed the album. Creature Comforts is Black Dice's last album to feature longtime drummer Hisham Bharoocha. The song "Skeleton" was described as the centerpiece of the album.

== Critical reception ==
Dominique Leone of Pitchfork declared that the band had "delivered one of this year's most interesting records and proved that you don't have to be noisy to make beautiful noise". Tiny Mix Tapes found the songs "well thought out and pleasant to listen to". In contrast, The Village Voice called the album "directionless [and] confused about what precisely their aesthetic is". Dusted Magazine noticed the variety of ideas but saw it as a positive, describing the album as a "very textural work, one that shifts in and out of its various ideas with the freedom of musique concrete".

== Track listing ==
1. "Cloud Pleaser" – 1:43
2. "Treetops" – 6:23
3. "Island" – 1:13
4. "Creature" – 8:54
5. "Live Loop" – 1:28
6. "Skeleton" – 15:25
7. "Schwip Schwap" – 2:01
8. "Night Flight" – 6:35

== Personnel ==
Bjorn Copeland - guitar, electronics

Eric Copeland - vocals, electronics

Aaron Warren - electronics, vocals

Hisham Bharoocha - electronics, drums, vocals

James Murphy - engineer

Tim Goldsworthy - engineer

Steve Revitte - engineer/mixer
