= Abe Vigoda (band) =

American punk rock band

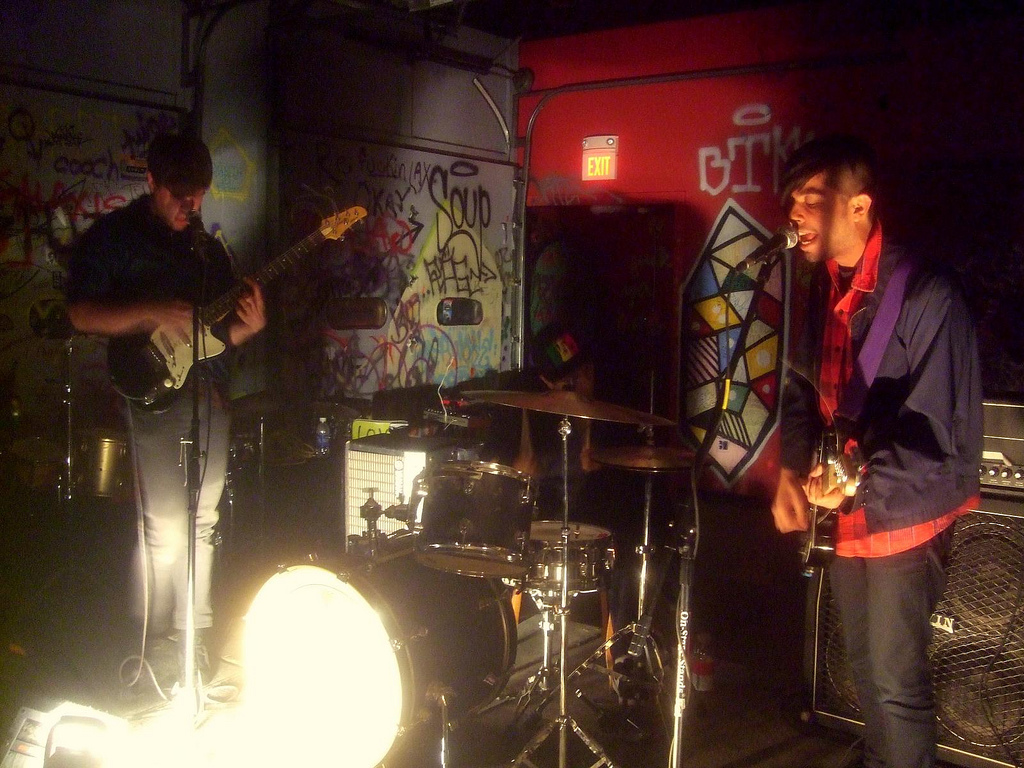
- Abe Vigoda performing in 2008

Background information
- Origin: Chino, California, United States
- Genres: Earlier: Tropical; punk rock; tropicalismo; Later: Dark wave; post-punk; shoegaze
- Years active: 2004–2014
- Labels: Olfactory Records; Silencio Records; Post Present Medium; Not Not Fun; Bella Union; oms-b
- Past members: Gerardo "Reggie" Guerrero; Zach Downing; Juan Velazquez; Michael Vidal; David Reichardt; Dane Chadwick

Abe Vigoda was an American punk rock band based in Los Angeles, California, United States, originally from Chino, California; a city in the Inland Empire. They frequently performed at the Smell.

== History ==
The band formed right after the members finished high school. The name is a reference to American character actor Abe Vigoda.

Skeleton, their third album, was released on July 8, 2008. In 2009, their EP Reviver followed. They finished recording their fourth album Crush on February 24, 2010, and it was released on September 20, 2010. It ranked 40th on Pitchfork Media's list The Top 50 Albums of 2010. Crush was a full transition for the band from their earlier sounds.

== Style ==
Some critics compared their music to another band, Vampire Weekend.

== Discography ==
=== Albums ===
- Sky Route/Star Roof (2006)
- Kid City (2007)
- Skeleton (2008)
- Crush (2010)

=== EPs ===
- Reviver (2009)

=== 7" vinyl ===
- Abe Vigoda / Child Pornography (2006)
- Abe Vigoda / Mikaela's Fiend (2007)
- Animal Ghosts (2007)
