= Nouns (album) =

Studio album by No Age
- Released: May 8, 2008
- Recorded: Infrasonic, Los Angeles (Tracks 1, 3, 5, 8, 9, and 12), Southern Studios, London (Tracks 2, 6, 7, and 11), and Fuller Compound, Los Angeles (Tracks 4 and 10)
- Genre: Noise pop; experimental pop; punk rock; lo-fi
- Length: 30:35
- Label: Sub Pop

No Age chronology
Weirdo Rippers (2007)	Nouns (2008)	Losing Feeling (2009)

Nouns is the debut studio album by American noise rock duo No Age. It was (partly) recorded at Southern Studios in London. The album was leaked onto the internet on April 16, 2008, and subsequently released by Sub Pop on May 6, 2008. On May 5, it earned a 9.2/10 rating from Pitchfork Media; and is the website's joint highest-reviewed original release of 2008 (along with Dear Science by TV on the Radio and Microcastle by Deerhunter). The album ranked third in Pitchfork Media's list of the top 50 albums of 2008, and was listed at number 50 on Rolling Stone's list of the best albums of 2008.

== Packaging ==
Nouns was released on LP, CD, and via download. The CD version features a 68-page full-color booklet with art, photos, lyrics and information about the release. The album was nominated for a Grammy in the category Best Recording Package.

== Reception ==
Professional ratings
Aggregate scores
Source	Rating
Metacritic	79/100
Review scores
Source	Rating
AllMusic	4/5 stars
The A.V. Club	C+
The Guardian	3/5 stars
Los Angeles Times	3.5/4 stars
Mojo	4/5 stars
MSN Music (Consumer Guide)	A−
NME	7/10
Pitchfork	9.2/10
Rolling Stone	3.5/5 stars
Spin	4/5 stars

The album received many positive reviews (as indicated by its Metacritic score of 79); "Teen Creeps" was also mentioned as one of the bright spots on the album. In particular, Spin cited "Teen Creeps" as "adding Superchunky pop riffs to their relentless punk vigor".

== Track listing ==
1. "Miner" – 1:50
2. "Eraser" – 2:41
3. "Teen Creeps" – 3:25
4. "Things I Did When I Was Dead" – 2:27
5. "Cappo" – 2:42
6. "Keechie" – 3:27
7. "Sleeper Hold" – 2:26
8. "Errand Boy" – 2:41
9. "Here Should Be My Home" – 2:03
10. "Impossible Bouquet" – 2:09
11. "Ripped Knees" – 2:53
12. "Brain Burner" – 1:51

== Singles ==
- "Eraser" was released as a single, with covers of Nate Denver's "Don't Stand Still", the Urinals' "Male Masturbation" and The Nerves' "When You Find Out" as B-sides.
- "Teen Creeps" was released as a single with the non-album B-side "Intimate Descriptions" (3:02).

== Chart performance ==
Chart (2008)	Peak position
Billboard 200	196
Top Heatseekers	7
Independent Albums	27
