= Beaches & Canyons =

Studio album by Black Dice
- Released: September 2002
- Recorded: December 2001 by Nicholas Vernhes at Rare Book Room
- Genre: Psychedelia, noise, electronic
- Length: 59:46
- Label: DFA, FatCat

Black Dice chronology
Beaches & Canyons (2002)	Creature Comforts (2004)

Professional ratings
Review scores
Source	Rating
AllMusic	4/5 stars
Pitchfork	8.5/10
The Rolling Stone Album Guide	3.5/5 stars
Tiny Mix Tapes	5/5
Uncut	4/5 stars
The Village Voice	C+

Beaches & Canyons is the first full-length album by experimental noise band Black Dice, released in 2002 on DFA and FatCat. It was named the 9th best album of 2000–2009 by Tiny Mix Tapes.

== Background ==
This album presents a transition in sound for Black Dice, specifically from their earlier roots in hardcore to a more experimental, meditative sound. When asked about their change in direction, band member Eric Copeland said: "Our shows used to be 'all songs.' Then it would be songs with these long transitions between things, instead of just flat or silent. When Aaron came along, we got better at that stuff, and that became more what we wanted to play. Playing the songs became secondary".

The band recorded the album in four or five days without any label deal, borrowing money from the Copelands' father to fund the sessions. They subsequently struggled to interest a label in releasing it: "we made this record, and we really liked it, but people we sent it to, we wouldn't hear back from anyone," which Eric described as "not exactly humiliating, but it puts you in your place." New York label DFA finally expressed interest in releasing the album on CD and vinyl.

It is not to be confused with the 1997 compilation of the same name by the Los Angeles-based indie-rock trio, The Summer Hits.

== Reception ==
Uncut stated that the group had as "organized their art-skronk into pulsating pieces in an avant-shamanic tradition that includes late Boredoms, early Popol Vuh and Coil. The dominant tone is violent ambience so that, remarkably, the noise eruptions seem no more malign than the superficially quiet passages that precede them. It all adds up to a genuinely psychedelic record." Pitchfork called the album "an intense document of Black Dice's evolution—cycling through styles and equipment like they're simple and meaningless tools, eyes on the goal of reorganizing sound and transforming it through sheer volume." Tiny Mix Tapes called it "an ethereal journey that will have your mind stimulated and body trembling," consisting of impressionistic "free-form compositions [...] ambiguous melodies and off-kilter polyrhythms." The Village Voice described the group as "original" but dismissed the album as a "novelty record."

== Track listing ==
1. "Seabird" – 6:37
2. "Things Will Never Be the Same" – 9:56
3. "The Dream Is Going Down" – 11:06
4. "Endless Happiness" – 15:26
5. "Big Drop" – 16:39

== Personnel ==
- Eric Copeland: Vocals
  - Shure SM57, 2x Digitech PDS1002s, Flip 2 Power VTX Tremolo, Crybaby Wah, Electro Harmonix Custom Made 40Db Low-Noise Pre-Amp, Behringer Eurorack MX 602A Mixer
- Bjorn Copeland: Guitar
  - Boss Tremolo, Boss Harmonist, DOD Gonkulator, MXR Blue Box, ProCo Turbo Rat, Boss DD5 Digital Delay, Korg Kaoss Pad
- Aaron Warren: Bass Sounds, Vocals
  - Ragini Pro Electronic Tambura, Digitech PDS1002, Zvex Wooly Mammoth, Sony AM/FM Radio, DOD Mixer R855, Shure SM57, Sony Tapecorder TC260, Signalflex A/B Box
- Hisham Bharoocha: Drums, Vocals, Percussion
  - Shure WH20, Electro Harmonix Poly Chorus, Digitech Whammy Wah, Digitech RDS400 Time Machine
