= Full Bloom (Soft Circle album) =

Album by Soft Circle

Studio album by Soft Circle
- Released: January 23, 2007
- Recorded: 2005 & 2006
- Genre: Experimental rock
- Length: 46:52
- Label: Eastern Developments Music

Professional ratings
Review scores
Source	Rating
Pitchfork Media	(8.2/10) link

Full Bloom is the debut solo album by Hisham Bharoocha, a.k.a. Soft Circle. It was released in January 2007 by Eastern Developments Music.

== Track listing ==
1. "Ascend" – 3:01
2. "Moon Oar Sunrise" – 8:20
3. "Sundazed" – 7:06
4. "Stones and Trees" – 7:08
5. "Shimmer" – 7:01
6. "Whirl" – 7:02
7. "Earthed" – 7:09
