= Weirdo Rippers =

Compilation album by No Age
- Released: 2007
- Genre: Experimental rock, noise rock, punk
- Length: 31:49
- Label: FatCat

No Age chronology
Weirdo Rippers (2007)	Nouns (2008)

Weirdo Rippers is a compilation by LA-based duo No Age. It was released by FatCat in 2007 and compiled early singles put out by the band. Although not technically an album, it is often seen as their debut LP.

== Cover art ==
The album's cover art depicts the front of LA music club The Smell, which No Age and their friend Amanda Vietta Andersen had painted in 2007 specifically to photograph for one of their album covers.

== Reception ==
Professional ratings
Review scores
Source	Rating
AllMusic	4/5 stars
The A.V. Club	B+
Drowned in Sound	9/10
MSN Music (Consumer Guide)	A−
Pitchfork	8.0/10
PopMatters	8/10
The Skinny	4/5 stars
Spin	3.5/5 stars

Weirdo Rippers ranked at number 8 on Drowned in Sound's Top 50 Albums of 2007.

Pitchfork placed Weirdo Rippers at number 12 on its list of the top 50 albums of 2007, and later at number 136 on its list of top 200 albums of the 2000s.

== Track listing ==
1. "Every Artist Needs a Tragedy" - 3:38
2. "Boy Void" - 1:45
3. "I Wanna Sleep" - 2:59
4. "My Life's Alright Without You" - 1:59
5. "Everybody's Down" - 2:20
6. "Sun Spots" - 1:22
7. "Loosen This Job" - 3:40
8. "Neck Escaper" - 2:08
9. "Dead Plane" - 4:12
10. "Semi-Sorted" - 3:46
11. "Escarpment" - 4:01
