= Post Present Medium =

American record label

Post Present Medium (or PPM) is a Los Angeles based independent record label started and run by Dean Allen Spunt, also from the band No Age.

Spunt started the label in 2001 with the release of a 7" by Portland/Olympia post punk band The Intima. Initial funding came from a settlement Spunt received as a teenager, when he got into a car accident with a member of the Backstreet Boys.

PPM is distributed by Secretly Distribution

== Artists with records on Post Present Medium ==
- Abe Vigoda
- Baby?
- Barr
- Behavior
- Behavior & Mayako XO
- Bell Labs
- Best Coast
- Blue Dolphin
- Brontez Purnell
- C.R.A.S.H.
- Callahan & Witscher
- Cate Kennan
- Chalk
- Chalk Circle
- Chronophage
- Cockfighter
- David Scott Stone
- Debt Rag
- DREAM_MEGA
- Dunes
- Earn
- Eric Copeland
- Eric Copeland & Josh Diamond
- Eugene Chadbourne & Jim McHugh
- Flaccid Mojo
- Gen Pop
- Guiding Light
- Gun Outfit
- High Places
- Infinite Body
- John Wiese
- K.I.T
- Kris & Tavi
- Leafblower
- Liars
- Lina Tullgren
- Mayako XO
- Mika Miko
- Miranda Spatula & Nowhere Flower
- Moses Brown
- Muscle Beach
- My Generation
- News Feeds
- No Age
- Non Plus Temps
- Nuke Watch
- Odwalla 88
- On the Ifnness
- Otis Houston Jr.
- P22
- Party Fowl
- Pink Trash Can
- Pure Shit
- Purity
- Quail Lungs
- Regal Degal
- Santigo Leyba & Only Violets
- Semi Trucks
- SFV Acid
- Shelter Music
- Silk Flowers
- Sissy Spacek
- Soddamn Innssein
- Soft Circle
- Stephen/Steven
- Syko Friend
- Tearist
- The Intima
- The Spatulas
- The Split Bell Chime
- The Urxed
- Total Abuse
- Ultra Twister
- Volunteers Park
- Wavves
- Whistler
- White Dog
- White Shit
- Wives
