= Overcompensate (song) =

Twenty One Pilots song

Single by Twenty One Pilots

from the album Clancy
- Released: February 29, 2024
- Recorded: 2023
- Genre: Hip hop; breakbeat; electronic rock
- Length: 3:56; 3:11 (edit)
- Label: Fueled by Ramen
- Songwriters: Tyler Joseph; Paul Meany
- Producers: Joseph; Meany

Twenty One Pilots singles chronology
"The Outside" (2021)	"Overcompensate" (2024)	"Next Semester" (2024)

Music video
- "Overcompensate" on YouTube

"Overcompensate" is a song by American musical duo Twenty One Pilots, released on February 29, 2024, through Fueled by Ramen as the lead single of their seventh studio album, Clancy. It was written and produced by frontman Tyler Joseph alongside Paul Meany. The song peaked at number 64 on the Billboard Hot 100 and number 34 in the UK.

== Background ==
On February 15, 2024, the cover art of previous Twenty One Pilots albums Vessel (2013), Blurryface (2015), Trench (2018), and Scaled and Icy (2021) were updated to be partially covered in red tape on streaming services. Additionally, several fans received mail sent by the "Sacred Municipality of Dema", a fictional dystopian city in the storyline introduced in Trench. The mail contained journal pages from the storyline's protagonist Clancy, who declared that with the "new power of psychokinesis", (Note: As depicted in the music video for "The Outside" (2022)) he "no longer feels powerless" and implied he wanted to cross a strait and "create an inferno" together with the "Banditos", a rebellion operating on the metaphorical continent of Trench. A new location called "Paladin Strait", situated between the continent and a small island called "Voldsøy", was revealed on a map attached with the mail, as well as a cryptic 2-2-9 pattern, leading fans to believe a new track would be released on February 29. This date was further supported when a BBC Radio 1 Future Sounds episode called "Twenty One Pilots Hottest Record" was scheduled to air on the same day.

On February 22, the band posted a short video titled "I Am Clancy" on social media, which recapped the storyline, including Clancy's attempts to escape Dema, joining the Banditos, being captured by the bishops of Dema and escaping to Voldsøy before obtaining a special power to take control of recently deceased people. (Note: As depicted in the music videos for "Heavydirtysoul" (2017), "Jumpsuit" (2018), "Nico and the Niners" (2018), "Levitate" (2018), "Saturday" (2021), and "The Outside" (2022), as well as the livestream concert in support of Scaled and Icy (2021)) The video ended with Clancy stating that he would be "returning to Trench".

On February 28, the band officially announced on social media that a new single titled "Overcompensate", along with its music video, would be released the following day at 13:00 ET.

== Music video ==
An accompanying music video for "Overcompensate", directed by Mark C. Eshleman and edited by him and Joseph, was primarily filmed at the Athenaeum Theatre in Columbus, Ohio. It premiered with the song on February 29, 2024. The video begins with illustrations and scenery in relation to the lore created by the band (coinciding with the German, French and Spanish voices at the beginning of the song). It then shows the duo playing at the venue, which begins to fill up with people who are known as the "citizens of Dema", all of whom are showing no emotion. Clancy (played by Joseph) then presents images of his journals and maps of the city to the citizens, before passing out as the video reveals the physical body in the venue had already been dead and was of someone else. It was possessed by Clancy, who arrives along with the imaginary Torchbearer (played by Josh Dun) on the continent of "Trench".

== Usage in media ==
"Overcompensate" is included on the soundtrack for the 2024 video game NHL 25, as well as in Fortnite Festival as a Jam Track.

== Track listing ==
Digital download / stream
No.	Title	Length
1.	"Overcompensate"	3:56
2.	"Overcompensate" (edit)	3:11

== Personnel ==
Credits adapted from Twenty One Pilots' official YouTube channel.

Twenty One Pilots

- Tyler Joseph – lead vocals, bass, piano, synthesizers, sampling, programming, songwriting, production
- Josh Dun – drums, drum engineering, percussion

Additional personnel

- Paul Meany – synthesizers, programming, songwriting, production, backing vocals
- Adam Hawkins – mixing
- Joe LaPorta – mastering

== Charts ==
=== Weekly charts ===
Weekly chart performance for "Overcompensate"
Chart (2024)	Peak position
Canada Hot 100 (Billboard)	73
Canada Rock (Billboard)	14
Czech Republic Singles Digital (ČNS IFPI)	77
Global 200 (Billboard)	70
Ireland (IRMA)	49
New Zealand Hot Singles (RMNZ)	3
UK Singles (Official Charts)	34
US Billboard Hot 100	64
US Hot Rock & Alternative Songs (Billboard)	7
US Rock & Alternative Airplay (Billboard)	6

=== Year-end charts ===
Year-end chart performance for "Overcompensate"
Chart (2024)	Position
US Hot Rock & Alternative Songs (Billboard)	87
US Rock Airplay (Billboard)	24
