= The Smell =

Music venue in Los Angeles

Coordinates: 34°3′0″N 118°14′43″W

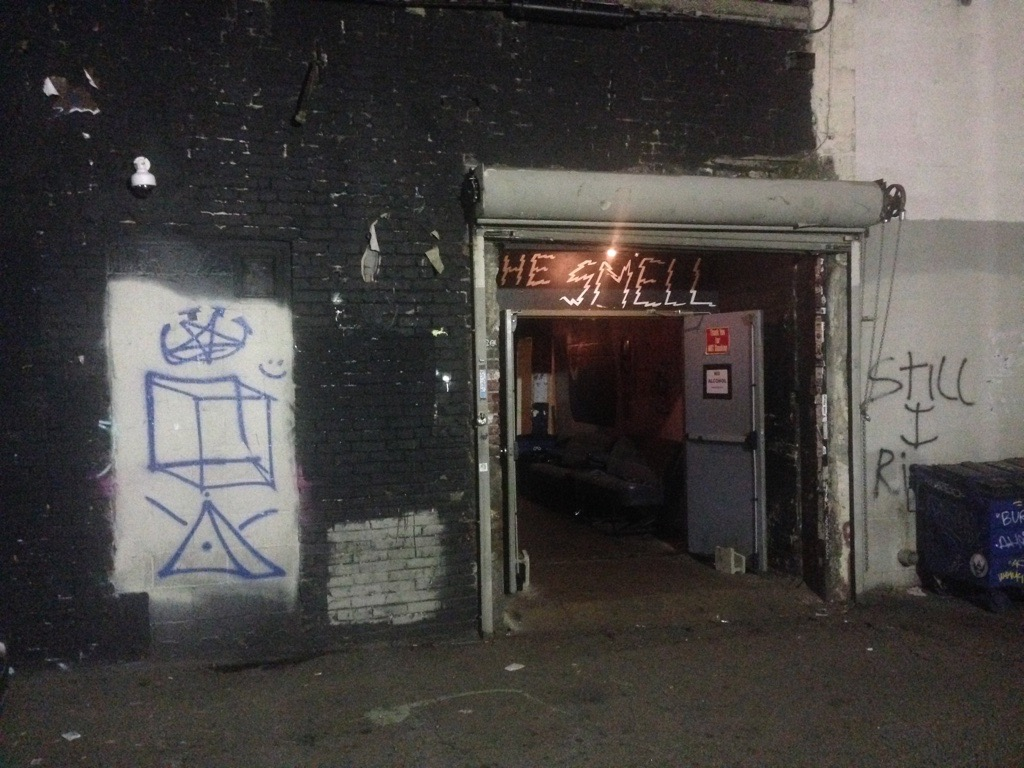
Entrance to The Smell in 2015

The Smell is an all-ages, alcohol and drug-free, punk rock and experimental music venue in Downtown Los Angeles, California. The Smell, notable for its DIY ethic, is home to many of the area's avant-garde performers and artists. The venue is maintained by Jim Smith, one of the four original organizers of the club, and a number of volunteers.

The Smell continues in the tradition of Los Angeles-based underground clubs such as The Masque and Jabberjaw. Aside from its primary function as a live music and performance art space, The Smell hosts a library, a vegan snack bar and a gallery space. The venue predates the conception of the Gallery Row district in which it is located. The Smell and the relatively new Gallery Row both border Skid Row.

== History ==
The Smell was founded by Ara Shirinyan, Jarrett Silberman, and Jim Smith as one of the few all-ages art/performance spaces in Los Angeles, after the demise of two local venues, Jabberjaw and the Impala Cafe, during the same week in late 1997. The Smell opened just a short time later, on January 6, 1998, with a show featuring acts: CRIB (Devin Sarno), Godzik Pink, Chick-uh Chick-ah, Nigel Lundemo, Kraig Grady and The Centimeters. The venue was originally located by the intersection of Magnolia and Lankershim in North Hollywood, but when the cost of rent rose during the NoHo Arts District boom in 1999, it relocated to cheaper Downtown Los Angeles. Shirinyan gave up his ownership before the venue's move, so Silberman, Smith, and Mac Mann constructed the new space.

Silberman left in late 2000, leaving only Smith to carry on with its maintenance. The venue continued to thrive, serving as a community hub for punk, experimental, noise and weirder electronic music fans, underage and otherwise. However, fire-code violations forced the club's closure in February 2003. Instead of shutting down for good, Smith, now its sole owner and its only full-time employee, used his own money and worked with volunteers to renovate the venue. Since reopening in September 2003, benefit shows help keep the space open and up to code.

The building along with Jim Smith, Kyle Mabson, and Imagymnist, were all featured in the video for Connection, a song by Hawnay Troof. The video went on to become the number 2 indie video of 2008 on MTV2, and was featured on VH1 and IFC.

In 2017, a mural was created over the façade of the venue, stating "Not Our President" with cartoon figures protesting against Donald Trump's presidency.

In 2024, musical duo Twenty One Pilots filmed the music video for their song "Next Semester" at The Smell.
