= List of awards and nominations received by Twenty One Pilots =

Twenty One Pilots awards and nominations
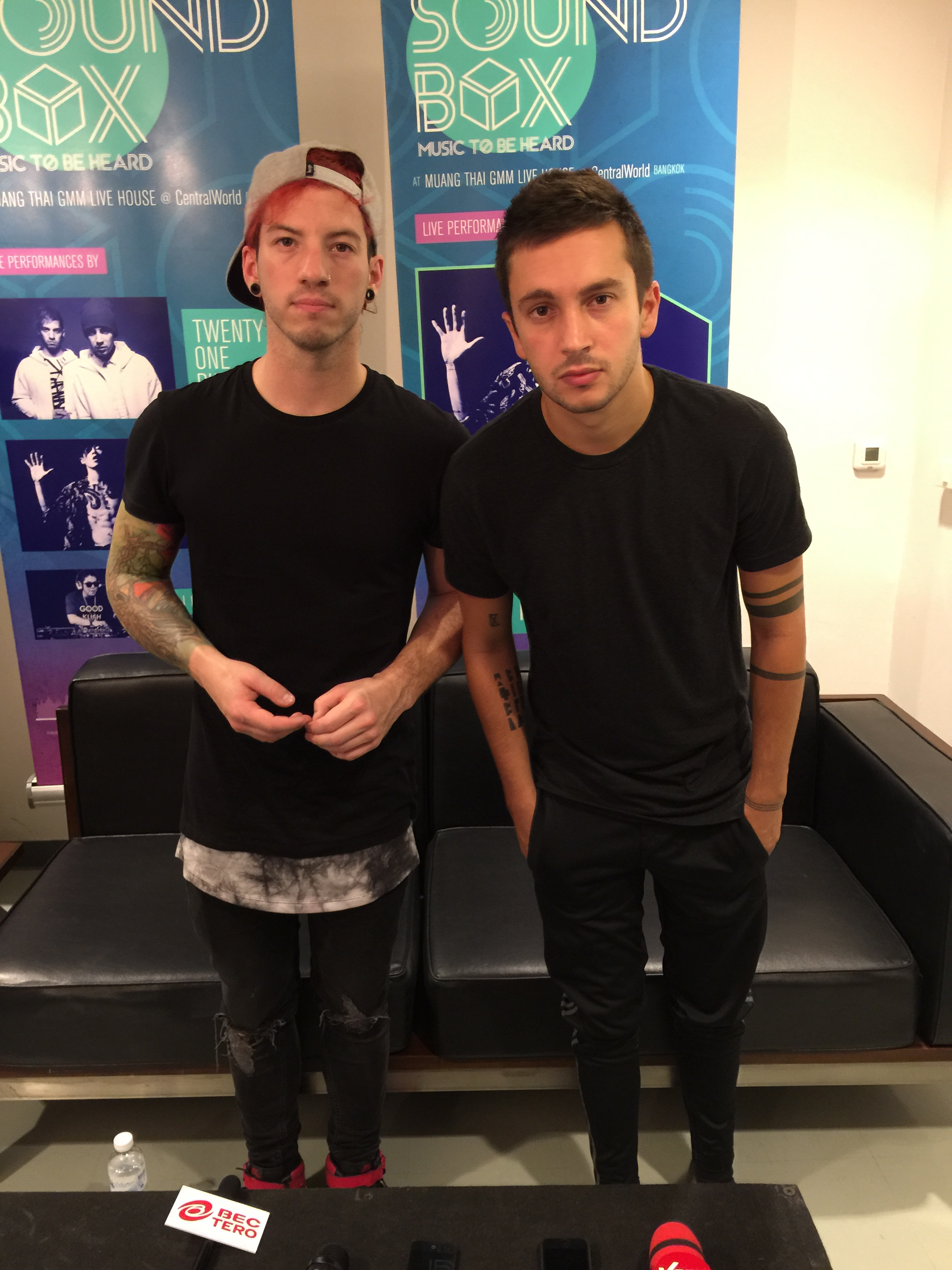
- Twenty One Pilots in Bangkok, Thailand in 2015
Awards and nominations
Award	Wins	Nominations
Alternative Press Music Awards	3	11
American Music Awards	6	8
ARIA Music Awards	0	1
BBC Radio 1	1	1
Billboard Music Awards	8	31
Billboard Touring Awards	0	1
BMI Awards	4	4
Brit Awards	0	2
Echo Awards	0	2
GAFFA Awards (Denmark)	1	1
Global Awards	0	1
Grammy Awards	1	6
Guild of Music Supervisors Awards	0	1
Hollywood Music in Media Awards	0	2
iHeartRadio Music Awards	11	27
Kerrang! Awards	2	3
LOS40 Music Awards	0	1
MTV Europe Music Awards	2	13
MTV Fandom Awards	0	1
MTV Italian Music Awards	0	1
MTV Millennial Awards	0	1
MTV Video Music Awards	2	16
mtvU Woodie Awards	0	2
Much Music Video Awards	0	2
Nickelodeon Kids' Choice Awards	1	7
NME Awards	0	1
NRJ Music Awards	1	1
People's Choice Awards	0	4
Radio Disney Music Awards	0	1
Rock Sound Awards	3	3
Teen Choice Awards	0	9
Telehit Awards	1	1
UK Music Video Awards	0	1
ZD Awards	0	1

Totals (Note: Certain award groups do not simply award one winner. They acknowledge several different recipients, have runners-up, and have third place. Since this is a specific recognition and is different from losing an award, runner-up mentions are considered wins in this award tally. For simplification and to avoid errors, each award in this list has been presumed to have had a prior nomination.)
- Wins: 47
- Nominations: 169

Twenty One Pilots is an American musical duo from Columbus, Ohio, consisting of frontman Tyler Joseph and bandmate Josh Dun. The band has received 47 awards from a total of 169 nominations.

== Awards and nominations ==
Name of the award ceremony, year presented, nominee(s) of the award, award category, and the result of the nomination
Award ceremony	Year (Note: Indicates the year of ceremony. Each year is linked to the article about the awards held that year, wherever possible.)	Nominee / Work	Category	Result	Ref.
Alternative Press Music Awards	2014	Vessel	Album of the Year	Nominated	
Alternative Press Music Awards	2014	Twenty One Pilots	Breakthrough Band	Nominated	
Alternative Press Music Awards	2014	Twenty One Pilots	Best Live Band	Nominated	
Alternative Press Music Awards	2014	Josh Dun	Best Drummer	Nominated	
Alternative Press Music Awards	2015	Twenty One Pilots	Best Live Band	Nominated	
Alternative Press Music Awards	2015	Twenty One Pilots	Most Dedicated Fans	Nominated	
Alternative Press Music Awards	2015	Twenty One Pilots	Tumblr Fandom of the Year	Nominated	
Alternative Press Music Awards	2016	Twenty One Pilots	Artist of the Year	Won	
Alternative Press Music Awards	2016	Blurryface	Album of the Year	Won	
Alternative Press Music Awards	2016	"Stressed Out"	Best Music Video	Nominated	
Alternative Press Music Awards	2017	Twenty One Pilots	Most Dedicated Fans	Won	
American Music Awards	2016	Twenty One Pilots	Favorite Duo or Group – Pop/Rock	Won	
American Music Awards	2016	Twenty One Pilots	Favorite Artist – Alternative Rock	Won	
American Music Awards	2017	Twenty One Pilots	Favorite Artist – Alternative Rock	Nominated	
American Music Awards	2020	Twenty One Pilots	Favorite Artist – Alternative Rock	Won	
American Music Awards	2025	Twenty One Pilots	Favorite Rock Artist	Won	
American Music Awards	2025	Clancy	Favorite Rock Album	Won	
American Music Awards	2026	Twenty One Pilots	Best Rock/Alternative Artist	Won	
American Music Awards	2026	Breach	Best Rock/Alternative Album	Nominated	
ARIA Music Awards	2016	Twenty One Pilots	Best International Artist	Nominated	
BBC Radio 1	2018	"Jumpsuit"	Hottest Record of the Year	Won	
Billboard Music Awards	2016	Twenty One Pilots	Top Duo/Group	Nominated	
Billboard Music Awards	2016	Twenty One Pilots	Top Rock Artist	Won	
Billboard Music Awards	2016	Blurryface	Top Rock Album	Won	
Billboard Music Awards	2016	"Stressed Out"	Top Rock Song	Nominated	
Billboard Music Awards	2017	Twenty One Pilots	Top Artist	Nominated	
Billboard Music Awards	2017	Twenty One Pilots	Billboard Chart Achievement	Won	
Billboard Music Awards	2017	Twenty One Pilots	Top Duo/Group	Won	
Billboard Music Awards	2017	Twenty One Pilots	Top Billboard 200 Artist	Nominated	
Billboard Music Awards	2017	Twenty One Pilots	Top Hot 100 Artist	Nominated	
Billboard Music Awards	2017	Twenty One Pilots	Top Song Sales Artist	Nominated	
Billboard Music Awards	2017	Twenty One Pilots	Top Radio Songs Artist	Won	
Billboard Music Awards	2017	Twenty One Pilots	Top Streaming Artist	Nominated	
Billboard Music Awards	2017	Twenty One Pilots	Top Rock Artist	Won	
Billboard Music Awards	2017	Blurryface	Top Billboard 200 Album	Nominated	
Billboard Music Awards	2017	Blurryface	Top Rock Album	Nominated	
Billboard Music Awards	2017	"Heathens"	Top Hot 100 Song	Nominated	
Billboard Music Awards	2017	"Heathens"	Top Selling Song	Nominated	
Billboard Music Awards	2017	"Heathens"	Top Streaming Song (Video)	Nominated	
Billboard Music Awards	2017	"Heathens"	Top Rock Song	Won	
Billboard Music Awards	2017	"Stressed Out"	Top Rock Song	Nominated	
Billboard Music Awards	2017	"Ride"	Top Rock Song	Nominated	
Billboard Music Awards	2018	Twenty One Pilots	Top Rock Artist	Nominated	
Billboard Music Awards	2019	Twenty One Pilots	Top Rock Artist	Nominated	
Billboard Music Awards	2019	Trench	Top Rock Album	Nominated	
Billboard Music Awards	2020	"Chlorine"	Top Rock Song	Nominated	
Billboard Music Awards	2020	"The Hype"	Top Rock Song	Nominated	
Billboard Music Awards	2020	Twenty One Pilots	Top Rock Artist	Nominated	
Billboard Music Awards	2021	Twenty One Pilots	Top Rock Artist	Nominated	
Billboard Music Awards	2021	"Level of Concern"	Top Rock Song	Nominated	
Billboard Music Awards	2022	Twenty One Pilots	Top Rock Artist	Nominated	
Billboard Music Awards	2022	Scaled and Icy	Top Rock Album	Won	
Billboard Touring Awards	2016	Twenty One Pilots	Breakthrough Artist	Nominated	
BMI Awards	2017	"Ride"	Award Winning Songs	Won	
BMI Awards	2017	"Stressed Out"	Award Winning Songs	Won	
BMI Awards	2021	"Level of Concern"	Songwriters & Publishers of the Most-Performed Songs of the Year	Won	
BMI Awards	2023	"Saturday"	Songwriters & Publishers of the Most-Performed Songs of the Year	Won	
Brit Awards	2017	Twenty One Pilots	International Group	Nominated	
Brit Awards	2019	Twenty One Pilots	International Group	Nominated	
Echo Awards	2017	Twenty One Pilots	Best International Newcomer	Nominated	
Echo Awards	2017	Twenty One Pilots	Best International Rock/Pop Group	Nominated	
GAFFA Awards (Denmark)	2016	Twenty One Pilots	Best Foreign New Act	Won	
Global Awards	2020	Twenty One Pilots	Best Indie	Nominated	
Grammy Awards	2017	"Stressed Out"	Record of the Year	Nominated	
Grammy Awards	2017	"Stressed Out"	Best Pop Duo/Group Performance	Won	
Grammy Awards	2017	"Heathens"	Best Rock Performance	Nominated	
Grammy Awards	2017	"Heathens"	Best Rock Song (Note: "Heathens" was nominated for Best Rock Song and Best Song Written for Visual Media in 2017, which are only presented to the songwriter of the song, Tyler Joseph.)	Nominated	
Grammy Awards	2017	"Heathens"	Best Song Written for Visual Media	Nominated	
Grammy Awards	2019	"Jumpsuit"	Best Rock Song (Note: "Jumpsuit" was nominated for Best Rock Song in 2019 which are only presented to the songwriter of the song, Tyler Joseph.)	Nominated	
Guild of Music Supervisors Awards	2017	"Heathens" for Suicide Squad	Best Song/Recording Created for a Film	Nominated	
Hollywood Music in Media Awards	2024	"The Line" for Arcane	Best Original Song – TV Show/Mini Series	Nominated	
Hollywood Music in Media Awards	2025	"The Line" for Arcane	Best Original Song – TV Show/Mini Series	Nominated	
iHeartRadio Music Awards	2016	Twenty One Pilots	Alternative Rock Artist of the Year	Won	
iHeartRadio Music Awards	2016	"Stressed Out"	Alternative Rock Song of the Year	Won	
iHeartRadio Music Awards	2017	"Stressed Out"	Song of the Year	Nominated	
iHeartRadio Music Awards	2017	Twenty One Pilots	Best Duo/Group of the Year	Won	
iHeartRadio Music Awards	2017	Twenty One Pilots	Alternative Rock Artist of the Year	Won	
iHeartRadio Music Awards	2017	Twenty One Pilots	Best Fan Army	Nominated	
iHeartRadio Music Awards	2017	"Ride"	Alternative Rock Song of the Year	Nominated	
iHeartRadio Music Awards	2017	"Heathens"	Alternative Rock Song of the Year	Won	
iHeartRadio Music Awards	2017	"Heathens"	Best Song from a Movie	Nominated	
iHeartRadio Music Awards	2017	"Heathens"	Best Lyrics	Nominated	
iHeartRadio Music Awards	2017	"Heathens"	Best Music Video	Nominated	
iHeartRadio Music Awards	2017	Blurryface	Alternative Rock Album of the Year	Won	
iHeartRadio Music Awards	2019	Twenty One Pilots	Duo/Group of the Year	Nominated	
iHeartRadio Music Awards	2019	Trench	Best Rock Album of the Year	Won	
iHeartRadio Music Awards	2020	"The Hype"	Alternative Rock Song of the Year	Nominated	
iHeartRadio Music Awards	2020	Twenty One Pilots	Alternative Rock Artist of the Year	Nominated	
iHeartRadio Music Awards	2021	Twenty One Pilots	Best Duo/Group of the Year	Nominated	
iHeartRadio Music Awards	2021	Twenty One Pilots	Alternative Rock Artist of the Year	Won	
iHeartRadio Music Awards	2021	"Level of Concern"	Alternative Rock Song of the Year	Won	
iHeartRadio Music Awards	2022	Twenty One Pilots	Alternative Artist of the Year	Nominated	
iHeartRadio Music Awards	2022	"Shy Away"	Alternative Song of the Year	Nominated	
iHeartRadio Music Awards	2023	Twenty One Pilots	Alternative Artist of the Year	Nominated	
iHeartRadio Music Awards	2025	Twenty One Pilots	Alternative Artist of the Year	Nominated	
iHeartRadio Music Awards	2025	Clancy	Alternative Album of the Year	Won	
iHeartRadio Music Awards	2026	Twenty One Pilots	Duo/Group of the Year	Nominated	
iHeartRadio Music Awards	2026	Twenty One Pilots	Alternative Artist of the Year	Won	
iHeartRadio Music Awards	2026	"The Contract"	Alternative Song of the Year	Nominated	
Kerrang! Awards	2016	Twenty One Pilots	Best Live Band	Nominated	
Kerrang! Awards	2016	Twenty One Pilots	Best Fanbase	Won	
Kerrang! Awards	2022	Twenty One Pilots	Best Live Act	Won	
LOS40 Music Awards	2016	Twenty One Pilots	International New Act of the Year	Nominated	
MTV Europe Music Awards	2013	Twenty One Pilots	Best Push Act	Nominated	
MTV Europe Music Awards	2015	Twenty One Pilots	Best Alternative	Nominated	
MTV Europe Music Awards	2016	Twenty One Pilots	Best Alternative	Won	
MTV Europe Music Awards	2016	Twenty One Pilots	Best Live Act	Won	
MTV Europe Music Awards	2016	Twenty One Pilots	Best US Act	Nominated	
MTV Europe Music Awards	2018	Twenty One Pilots	Best Alternative	Nominated	
MTV Europe Music Awards	2019	Twenty One Pilots	Best Alternative	Nominated	
MTV Europe Music Awards	2019	Twenty One Pilots	Best World Stage	Nominated	
MTV Europe Music Awards	2020	Twenty One Pilots	Best Alternative	Nominated	
MTV Europe Music Awards	2021	Twenty One Pilots	Best Alternative	Nominated	
MTV Europe Music Awards	2022	Twenty One Pilots Concert Experience (Roblox)	Best Metaverse Performance	Nominated	
MTV Europe Music Awards	2022	Twenty One Pilots	Best Alternative	Nominated	
MTV Europe Music Awards	2024	Twenty One Pilots	Best Alternative	Nominated	
MTV Fandom Awards	2016	Twenty One Pilots	Bandom of the Year	Nominated	
MTV Italian Music Awards	2017	Twenty One Pilots	Best International Band	Nominated	
MTV Millennial Awards	2017	"Heathens"	International Hit of the Year	Nominated	
MTV Video Music Awards	2013	"Holding On to You"	Artist to Watch	Nominated	
MTV Video Music Awards	2016	"Heathens"	Best Rock Video	Won	
MTV Video Music Awards	2017	"Heavydirtysoul"	Best Rock Video	Won	
MTV Video Music Awards	2019	"My Blood"	Best Rock Video	Nominated	
MTV Video Music Awards	2020	Twenty One Pilots	Best Group	Nominated	
MTV Video Music Awards	2020	"Level of Concern"	Best Music Video From Home	Nominated	
MTV Video Music Awards	2020	"Level of Concern"	Best Alternative	Nominated	
MTV Video Music Awards	2021	"Shy Away"	Best Alternative	Nominated	
MTV Video Music Awards	2021	Twenty One Pilots	Group of the Year	Nominated	
MTV Video Music Awards	2022	"Saturday"	Best Alternative	Nominated	
MTV Video Music Awards	2022	Twenty One Pilots Concert Experience (Roblox)	Best Metaverse Performance	Nominated	
MTV Video Music Awards	2024	Twenty One Pilots	Best Group	Nominated	
MTV Video Music Awards	2025	"The Contract"	Best Rock	Nominated	
MTV Video Music Awards	2025	Twenty One Pilots	Best Group	Nominated	
MTV Video Music Awards	2026	"Drag Path"	Best Alternative	Nominated	
MTV Video Music Awards	2026	Twenty One Pilots	Best Group	Nominated	
mtvU Woodie Awards	2013	Twenty One Pilots	Breaking Woodie	Nominated	
mtvU Woodie Awards	2017	Twenty One Pilots	Woodie of the Year	Nominated	
Much Music Video Awards	2016	Twenty One Pilots	International Duo or Group	Nominated	
Much Music Video Awards	2017	Twenty One Pilots	International Duo or Group	Nominated	
Nickelodeon Kids' Choice Awards	2017	Twenty One Pilots	Favorite New Artist	Won	
Nickelodeon Kids' Choice Awards	2017	Twenty One Pilots	Favorite Music Group	Nominated	
Nickelodeon Kids' Choice Awards	2017	"Heathens"	Favorite Song	Nominated	
Nickelodeon Kids' Choice Awards	2017	"Stressed Out"	Favorite Music Video	Nominated	
Nickelodeon Kids' Choice Awards	2018	Twenty One Pilots	Favorite Music Group	Nominated	
Nickelodeon Kids' Choice Awards	2019	Twenty One Pilots	Favorite Music Group	Nominated	
Nickelodeon Kids' Choice Awards	2026	Twenty One Pilots	Favorite Music Group or Duo	Nominated	
NME Awards	2017	Twenty One Pilots	Worst Band	Nominated	
NRJ Music Awards	2016	Twenty One Pilots	International Revelation of the Year	Won	
People's Choice Awards	2017	Twenty One Pilots	Group of the Year	Nominated	
People's Choice Awards	2018	Twenty One Pilots	Group of the Year	Nominated	
People's Choice Awards	2020	Twenty One Pilots	Group of the Year	Nominated	
People's Choice Awards	2021	Twenty One Pilots	Group of the Year	Nominated	
Radio Disney Music Awards	2017	Twenty One Pilots	Best Group	Nominated	
Rock Sound Awards	2018	Trench	Album of the Year	Won	
Rock Sound Awards	2024	Twenty One Pilots	25 Icon Award	Won	
Rock Sound Awards	2024	Clancy	Album of the Year	Won	
Teen Choice Awards	2015	"Tear in My Heart"	Choice Rock Song	Nominated	
Teen Choice Awards	2016	"Stressed Out"	Choice Rock Song	Nominated	
Teen Choice Awards	2016	"Stressed Out"	Choice Song Group	Nominated	
Teen Choice Awards	2017	"Heathens"	Choice Song Group	Nominated	
Teen Choice Awards	2017	"Heathens"	Choice Rock/Alternative Song	Nominated	
Teen Choice Awards	2017	Twenty One Pilots	Choice Music Group	Nominated	
Teen Choice Awards	2017	Twenty One Pilots	Choice Rock Group	Nominated	
Teen Choice Awards	2018	Twenty One Pilots	Choice Rock Group	Nominated	
Teen Choice Awards	2019	Twenty One Pilots	Choice Rock Group	Nominated	
Telehit Awards	2016	Twenty One Pilots	Best Rock Band	Won	
UK Music Video Awards	2017	"Heavydirtysoul"	Best Rock/Indie Video – International	Nominated	
ZD Awards	2018	Twenty One Pilots	Best Foreign Act	Nominated	
We Love Awards	2025	"Downstairs"	Mainstream Impact Award	Nominated	
