= Breach =

Breach, Breached, or The Breach may refer to:

== Places ==
- Breach, Kent, United Kingdom
- Breach, West Sussex, United Kingdom
- The Breach, Great South Bay in the State of New York

== People ==
- Breach (DJ), an Electronic/House music act
- Miroslava Breach (1963–2017), Mexican journalist

== Arts, entertainment, and media ==
=== Films ===
- Breach (2007 film), a film directed by Billy Ray starring Chris Cooper and Ryan Phillippe
- Breach (2020 film), a 2020 film starring Bruce Willis
- The Breach (film), a 1970 French film by Claude Chabrol

=== Games ===
- Breach (1987 video game), a 1987 action game by Omnitrend Software
- Breach (2011 video game), a defunct 2011 first-person shooter by Atomic Games
- Breach (2018 video game), a cancelled 2018 action RPG by QC Games
- Breached (video game), a 2016 action puzzle by Drama Drifters
- Breach, an agent from the 2020 first-person shooter Valorant

=== Journalism ===
- The Breach (website), a Canadian news website launched in 2021

=== Music ===
==== Groups ====
- Breach (band), a Swedish post-hardcore band
- Breached, a Canadian rock band

==== Albums ====
- Breach (Lewis Capaldi EP), 2018
- Breach (Shivaree EP), 2004
- Breach (The Wallflowers album), 2000
- Breach (Twenty One Pilots album), 2025

==== Songs ====
- "Breach (Walk Alone)", 2018, by Martin Garrix and Blinders
- "Breach", a song by Erra from the 2018 album Neon

=== Television ===
- "Breach", a 2010 episode of the first season of NCIS: Los Angeles
- "The Breach" (Star Trek: Enterprise), a 2003 episode of the second season of Star Trek: Enterprise

=== Other arts, entertainment, and media ===
- Breach (character), a superhero from DC Comics
- Warp core breach, a catastrophic event aboard a starship in the Star Trek fictional universe

== Law ==
- Breach of confidence, a common law tort that protects private information that is conveyed in confidence
- Breach of contract, a situation in which a binding agreement is not honored by one or more of the parties to the contract
- Breach of duty of care, common law negligence
- Breach of promise, a former common law tort
- Breach of the peace, a legal term used in constitutional law in English-speaking countries
- Efficient breach, a breach of contract that the breaching party considers desirable
- Fundamental breach, a breach so fundamental that it permits the aggrieved party to terminate performance of the contract

== Science, social science, and technology ==
- BREACH, a security exploit against the HTTPS protocol
- Breach, cetacean surfacing behaviour (a whale's leap out of the water)
- Breaching experiment, a social experiment that tests people's reactions to the violation of accepted social norms
- Data breach, the release of secure or private information to an untrusted environment
- Security breach, unauthorized access to a computer

== Other uses ==
- Door breaching, a process to force open closed and/or locked doors
- Breach (siege), the opening by artillery of a gap in the walls sufficient to be assaulted by infantry during siege warfare

== See also ==
- Breech (disambiguation)
- Tortious interference, a tort involving inducing persons to breach a contract
