= City Walls (song) =

2025 single by Twenty One Pilots

Single by Twenty One Pilots

from the album Breach
- Released: September 12, 2025
- Genre: Rap rock
- Length: 5:22
- Label: Fueled by Ramen
- Songwriters: Tyler Joseph; Paul Meany
- Producers: Tyler Joseph; Paul Meany

Twenty One Pilots singles chronology
"Drum Show" (2025)	"City Walls" (2025)	"Drag Path" (2026)

Music video
- "City Walls" on YouTube

"City Walls" is a song by the American musical duo Twenty One Pilots, released on September 12, 2025, through Fueled by Ramen, as the third single from their eighth studio album, Breach. It was written and produced by frontman Tyler Joseph alongside longtime collaborator Paul Meany.

== Background ==
Twenty One Pilots released their seventh studio album, Clancy, on May 24, 2024. The visual album was intended to serve as the conclusion to the duo's decade-long conceptual series which began with Blurryface (2015), but its closing track, "Paladin Strait" ended on a cliffhanger. During the May 2025 dates of the Clancy World Tour, the band shared a series of cryptic clues and Easter eggs on their social media accounts that hinted at a continuation in the series. On May 21, 2025, the duo announced their eighth studio album, Breach, which released in September of the same year.

== Release and composition ==
Twenty One Pilots released Breach on September 12, 2025; "City Walls" is the opening track. The song contains a sample of "Heavydirtysoul", the opening track of the band's fourth album, Blurryface (2015).

== Music video ==
=== Background ===
An accompanying music video for "City Walls", directed by Jensen Noen, was released alongside its parent album. It runs for nine minutes and fifty-five seconds, the longest music video in the duo's videography. Before its release, frontman Tyler Joseph revealed that the video serves as the proper conclusion to the story surrounding the conceptual city of "Dema", a fictional location in the world of "Trench", and its two central characters, Clancy (portrayed by Joseph) and Torchbearer (portrayed by drummer Josh Dun). With a stated production budget of US$1 million, "City Walls" is one of the most expensive music videos of all time, as well as the second most expensive music video of the 2020s.

"Intentions", the closing track of Breach, is played during the end credits. It is a backmasked track of "Truce", the closing track of the duo's third studio album and major-label debut Vessel (2013).

=== Synopsis ===
The video begins immediately after the events of "Paladin Strait" and "The Contract". Clancy engages in battle against Nico, the leader of the nine Bishops governing Dema situated atop the central circular tower rising above the cement city. The Torchbearer and a group of Banditos rush up the stairs to assist Clancy. Throughout the battle, Clancy is plagued by flashbacks of Nico, each one recalling a memory from his journey where he was beaten by Nico. (Note: As depicted in the music videos for "Heavydirtysoul" (2017), "Levitate" (2018), and "Jumpsuit" (2018).). After Nico fatally impales Clancy with his sharpened antlers, he breaks them in half, shattering the connection between Clancy and Nico that had allowed Clancy to wield Nico's powers. In a final act, Clancy uses his "final power of the seizing" (Note: Clancy casts his fingers in the form of the band's logo to integrate with Nico instead of dying.) to merge their souls into one.

When the Torchbearer bursts into the room where Clancy and Nico fought, Clancy, now seemingly transformed, wears a Bishop hood and hands out the remaining robes to his squad. He offers one to the Torchbearer, who silently declines and departs the tower as Clancy's team assumes the roles of the new Bishops of Dema.

As the Torchbearer packs their belongings at the base of the tower, one of the remaining Banditos asks him what to do next. The Torchbearer responds that Clancy is still out there and they will always try again. With that, he and the Bandito member leave Dema to start the new journey to find the next Clancy.

== Critical reception ==
Critics that have reviewed Breach have noted its references to other Twenty One Pilots songs such as "Migraine" and "Holding On to You".

== Accolades ==
Year-end lists
Publication	Accolade	Rank	Ref.
Jesus Freak Hideout	Christopher Smith's Song Picks	3	
Jesus Freak Hideout	David Craft's Song Picks	4	

== Charts ==
Chart performance for "City Walls"
Chart (2025)	Peak position
Canada Hot 100 (Billboard)	87
Canada Mainstream Rock (Billboard Canada)	30
Canada Modern Rock (Billboard Canada)	2
Czech Republic Singles Digital (ČNS IFPI)	89
Global 200 (Billboard)	126
Ireland (IRMA)	60
New Zealand Hot Singles (RMNZ)	3
Nicaragua Anglo Airplay (Monitor Latino)	2
UK Singles (Official Charts)	49
US Billboard Hot 100	83
US Hot Rock & Alternative Songs (Billboard)	11
US Rock & Alternative Airplay (Billboard)	7
