= Breeching =

Breeching (also britching) may refer to:

- Breeching (boys), putting boys in breeches or trousers for the first time
- Breeching (tack), a strap around the haunches of a draft, pack or riding animal
- Breeching, the flue of a boiler

== See also ==
- Breech (disambiguation)
- False breeching (disambiguation)
- Breach (disambiguation)
