= The Contract (song) =

2025 single by Twenty One Pilots

Single by Twenty One Pilots

from the album Breach
- Released: June 12, 2025
- Recorded: 2025
- Length: 3:45
- Label: Fueled by Ramen
- Songwriters: Tyler Joseph; Paul Meany; Dominic Harrison; Matt Schwartz
- Producers: Tyler Joseph; Paul Meany

Twenty One Pilots singles chronology
"Doubt (demo)" (2025)	"The Contract" (2025)	"Drum Show" (2025)

Music video
- "The Contract" on YouTube

"The Contract" is a song by American musical duo Twenty One Pilots. It was released through Fueled by Ramen on June 12, 2025, as the lead single of their eighth studio album, Breach (2025). It was written by frontman Tyler Joseph, frequent collaborator Paul Meany, Yungblud, and Matt Schwartz, and produced by the former two. The song peaked at number 33 on the UK singles chart, making it their fourth-highest-charting song there, behind "Drag Path", Stressed Out", and "Heathens".

== Background ==
Twenty One Pilots released their seventh album, Clancy, on May 24, 2024. The visual album was intended to serve as the conclusion to the duo's decade-long conceptual series which began with Blurryface (2015), but its closing track "Paladin Strait" ended on a cliffhanger. During the May 2025 dates of the Clancy World Tour, the band shared a series of cryptic clues and Easter eggs on their social media accounts that hinted at a continuation in the series.

On May 21, 2025, the duo announced their eighth studio album, Breach, which was released in September of that year. Along with the album's announcement, they revealed the title of the lead single, "The Contract", and its release date, June 12.

== Composition ==
Sonically, "The Contract" is a track that combines elements of nu metal, emo, hip-hop and hyperpop, while not explicitly tying itself down to one or the other. Lyrically, "The Contract" features seemingly anxious lyrics, in which the narrator fears a "necromancer" outside, and engages in paranoid activities, such as checking doors and windows and being sure to stay quiet.

== Music video ==
An accompanying music video for "The Contract" was directed by Frédéric de Pontcharra and released the same day as the single. The video continues immediately after the ending of "Paladin Strait" and features the duo performing erratically while surrounded by ambiguous entities with glowing red eyes. It concludes with drummer Josh Dun handing frontman Tyler Joseph a coat, a visual echoed on Breach's album cover. As of August 8, 2026, the music video has over 20 million views on YouTube.

== Critical reception ==
Mix Vale praised "The Contract" as an "expansive" track and a "statement of intent" for Twenty One Pilots' next phase. Rolling Stone's Kory Grow commended the song's eclectic production while describing it as a "total sensory assault." In a less positive review, Paolo Ragusa for Consequence appreciated the band's dedication to their decade-long narrative and compared the song to Linkin Park's album Meteora, citing a "nu metal twist". However, he ultimately found "The Contract" to be "frankly atrocious."

== Accolades ==
Awards and nominations for "The Contract"
Ceremony	Year	Award	Result	Ref.
MTV Video Music Awards	2025	Best Rock	Nominated	

== Personnel ==
All credits are adapted from Tidal, except where noted.

=== Twenty One Pilots ===
- Tyler Joseph – vocals, piano, synthesizer, bass, guitar, songwriting, production
- Josh Dun – drums

=== Additional personnel ===
- Paul Meany – production, songwriting
- Yungblud – songwriting
- Matt Schwartz – songwriting
- Adam Hawkins – mixing
- Joe LaPorta – mastering
- Unnus Latif – drum technician, assistant engineer

== Charts ==
Chart performance for "The Contract"
Chart (2025)	Peak position
Colombia Anglo Airplay (Monitor Latino)	10
Costa Rica Anglo Airplay (Monitor Latino)	14
Global 200 (Billboard)	131
Guatemala Anglo Airplay (Monitor Latino)	16
Ireland (IRMA)	51
New Zealand Hot Singles (RMNZ)	3
UK Singles (Official Charts)	33
US Bubbling Under Hot 100 (Billboard)	4
US Hot Rock & Alternative Songs (Billboard)	15
US Rock & Alternative Airplay (Billboard)	8
