= Paladin Strait =

Song by Twenty One Pilots

from the album Clancy
- Released: May 24, 2024
- Recorded: 2023–2024
- Length: 6:28
- Label: Fueled by Ramen; Elektra
- Songwriters: Tyler Joseph; Paul Meany
- Producers: Joseph; Meany

Music video
- "Paladin Strait" on YouTube

"Paladin Strait" is a song by the American musical duo Twenty One Pilots from their 2024 album Clancy. It is the last song on the album, and is the longest song the duo has recorded thus far.

== Composition and lyrics ==
"Paladin Strait" consists of synths and a ukulele that has been described by Wall of Sound as feeling "like a voyage, a grand adventure in which its soft plucking and gentle strums usher you forward on a glorious but daunting journey". The song itself is followed by a break of silence before an acoustic outro.

== Reception ==
Paste magazine stated during a review of Clancy that "the music sounds joyful but the lyrics are anything but" commenting that Joseph was "ultimately losing the battle he began both at the start of this record and at the start of the duo’s entire saga nine years ago."

== Music video ==
The music video for the song premiered on June 21, 2024, and was the last music video to be released for the album and closes the lore of the album. The video was directed by Jensen Noen. It shows an army of "Banditos" led by the title character Clancy, played by Tyler Joseph, and Josh Dun in battle with the Glorious Gones. Clancy climbs the tower where the nine Bishops, who are the leaders of Dema, reside. He is confronted by Nico (also known as Blurryface), the leader of the Bishops. The music video was not finished by the time the album was released, so a placeholder video of Joseph playing a ukulele in front of an ocean was released before then. The cliffhanger ending of the video would be continued in the music video for "The Contract" and concluded with the video for "City Walls" – 'The Contract' being one of two singles for the duo's following album, Breach (2025).

== Personnel ==
Twenty One Pilots

- Tyler Joseph – lead vocals, synthesizer, ukulele, keyboards, bass, programming, songwriter
- Josh Dun – drums, percussion, backing vocals

Additional musicians

- Paul Meany - synthesizers, backing vocals, programming, songwriter

== Live performances ==
The song was played during the first night of the Clancy World Tour. It continued to be on the setlist until the tour concluded in London in 2025. The song was then removed from the setlist for The Clancy Tour: Breach, the second North American leg of the tour.

== Charts ==
Chart performance for "Paladin Strait"
Chart (2024)	Peak position
US Hot Rock & Alternative Songs (Billboard)	47
