= False breeching =

False breeching can refer to:

- False breeching on the shafts of an animal-drawn vehicle; see Breeching (tack)
- False breeching on a firearm or other weapon; see Firearm

== See also ==
- Breech (disambiguation)
- Breeching (disambiguation)
