= Drag Path =

Single by Twenty One Pilots

from the album Breach (Digital Remains)
- Released: February 17, 2026
- Length: 5:04 (original); 3:44 (single)
- Label: Fueled by Ramen; Atlantic
- Songwriter: Tyler Joseph
- Producers: Tyler Joseph; Paul Meany

Twenty One Pilots singles chronology
"City Walls" (2025)	"Drag Path" (2026)

Music video
- "Drag Path" on YouTube

"Drag Path" is a song by the American music duo Twenty One Pilots. It was written by frontman Tyler Joseph, who produced it with Paul Meany. First released on September 12, 2025 as part of a limited-time issue of the duo's eighth studio album, Breach (2025), the song was issued as a single on February 17, 2026, via Fueled by Ramen and Atlantic Records. "Drag Path" peaked at number 57 on the Billboard Hot 100 and became the duo's third-highest-charting single in the UK, peaking at number 23, as well as their highest-charting single in Australia since "Heathens" (2016). “Drag Path” is Twenty One Pilots’ biggest mainstream hit song since “Level of Concern” (2020).

== Release and promotion ==
"Drag Path" initially appeared as a bonus track on Breach (Digital Remains), a limited-time issue of the duo's eighth studio album, Breach (2025). The edition was available for the first week of Breach's release, with a purchase being required to obtain the track, before being delisted. Despite this, the song went viral on TikTok, garnering over 1.5 billion views and 75,000 recreations on the platform, compelling the duo to officially release it as a single. Upon release, the song was accompanied by an animated music video, directed by Tobias Gundorff Boesen. The duo altered the single version of the song slightly from the original version in an attempt to "save something special for those who purchased it originally."

== Live performances ==
The duo began performing "Drag Path" while headlining a series of music festivals in 2026. They also performed it at the 2026 American Music Awards after accepting their award for Best Rock/Alternative Artist.

== Composition ==
=== Lyrics ===
By definition, a "drag path" is a trail left behind by an object being dragged on the ground. In this song specifically, the term is used to metaphorically refer to a remnant of past trauma or other loss.

=== Style ===
Writing for The Case Western Reserve Observer, Penelope Cloonan noted that the song "packs an emotional punch", containing "raw vocals and grand instrumentation". In comparison between the original and single releases of the song, the single version is shorter and lacks the entire first verse and outro. It also features an additional pre-chorus and additional minor arrangement and production changes. NME has praised the track as "emotional and epic". The single release received mixed reception from audiences: some listeners enjoyed the song, regardless of the edit, while others believed that the original track was "too important" to be left exclusively to those who purchased it originally.

== Music video ==
The music video for "Drag Path" is an edited version of a 2010 short film directed by Tobias Gundorff Boesen, "Out of a Forest", and was released to accompany the single release of the song on February 17, 2026. The video depicts animated stop-motion characters of clay-constructed animals.

== Personnel ==
Credits adapted from Tidal. (Note: Vocals are credited to "twenty one pilots" on streaming services, Joseph and Dun's vocal contributions are according to various news sources.)

=== Twenty One Pilots ===
- Tyler Joseph – vocals, guitar, bass, piano, keyboards, songwriter, producer
- Josh Dun – drums, backing vocals

=== Additional personnel ===
- Adam Hawkins – mixer
- Joe LaPorta – masterer
- Paul Meany – producer
- Unnus Latif – engineer

== Charts ==
Chart performance for "Drag Path"
Chart (2025–2026)	Peak position
Australia (ARIA)	59
Austria (Ö3 Austria Top 40)	44
Canada Hot 100 (Billboard)	42
Canada Modern Rock (Billboard Canada)	23
Colombia Anglo Airplay (Monitor Latino)	13
Czech Republic Singles Digital (ČNS IFPI)	46
Germany (GfK)	80
Global 200 (Billboard)	57
Ireland (IRMA)	25
Lithuania (AGATA)	64
Netherlands (Single Top 100)	84
New Zealand (Recorded Music NZ)	31
Norway (IFPI Norge)	70
Slovakia Singles Digital (ČNS IFPI)	63
Sweden Heatseeker (Sverigetopplistan)	3
Switzerland (Schweizer Hitparade)	62
UK Singles (Official Charts)	23
UK Christian Airplay (Cross Rhythms)	2
US Billboard Hot 100	57
US Hot Rock & Alternative Songs (Billboard)	9
US Rock & Alternative Airplay (Billboard)	13

== Release history ==
Release history and formats for "Drag Path"
Region	Date	Format(s)	Label(s)	Ref.
Various	September 12, 2025	Digital download	Fueled by Ramen	
Various	February 17, 2026	Digital download; streaming	Atlantic Records	
