= Shadow Realms =

Cancelled video game

- Developer(s): BioWare Austin
- Publisher(s): Electronic Arts
- Director(s): James Ohlen
- Producer(s): Dallas Dickinson
- Designer(s): Gabe Amatangelo
- Writer(s): Hall Hood
- Engine: Frostbite 3
- Platform(s): Microsoft Windows
- Release: Cancelled
- Genre(s): Action role-playing game
- Mode(s): Single-player, multiplayer

Shadow Realms is a cancelled action role-playing video game previously under development by BioWare's Austin studio. The game was set to be published by Electronic Arts for Microsoft Windows, and was scheduled for release in 2015. On February 9, 2015, BioWare Austin announced that the development on Shadow Realms would not continue.

== Plot ==
Set in both modern day Earth and the parallel world of Embra, Heroes possessing magical powers wake up and are pulled into a dark realm and centuries old battle. They take part in adventures, facing off against an array of creatures in a war against the Shadow Legions, to save all of humanity.

The backstory for the game states that hidden pathways that exist between Earth and Embra have been crossed by only a few in all history. Arcane energy flows through the magical world of Embra from its molten core. Those born with the talent to harness this power can perform feats that reshape reality. Long before humans ever walked the Earth, cultures fueled by magic rose to greatness and fell to ruin on Embra over its millennia of history, destroying once grand civilizations and their achievements. Towering monuments and mystic relics that are preserved forever by arcane energies serve as legacies for these vanished people.

The Radiant Empires are the first great nations in Embra's long past to break their world's cycle of self-destruction. These diverse cultures joined together five thousand years ago to preserve themselves and their world in a spirit of cooperation and goodwill. Their alliance has been marked by unity, prosperity and significant advancements in mystic knowledge. The greatest of these discoveries was the revelation that Embra was not alone, but that another world much like it, but with an extremely weak flow of magic, Earth, was in existence.

When human civilization was still in its infancy, Embra's boldest explorers bravely crossed the barrier between the two worlds, and quickly realized that humanity's reactions towards them could be unpredictable and violent. Alongside this, Earth's weak flow of magical power made it uninhabitable to them.

Unfortunately, they had far greater concerns back home. After millennia spent in unchallenged peace and prosperity, the pacifist scholars and artists of the Radiant Empires were no match for the arrival of an enemy that knew only war. Though much about them remained shrouded in mystery, these foul invaders - the Shadow Legions - drove the Radiant Empires from their strongholds and toppled their cities. The citizens of the Radiant Empires knew their entire way of life was doomed without an army to defend it. As a result, they turned to their only hope: Earth.

A fraction of Earth's population, those modern society regards as urban legends, has always been able to wield magic, but the flow of magical energy on Earth is so poor that few ever suspect their potential. On Embra, the command of arcane force is infinite and the Radiant Empires have recruited strong young men and women to fight the Shadow Legions for almost a hundred years. Embra's magical human warriors channel power in many ways. Guns are one of Earth's only inventions that still function on Embra.

After decades of hard-won victories that pushed back the Shadow Legions, humanity and the Radiant Empires thought the long war was almost over. They were wrong. The enemy has returned, assisted by new allies: cunning beings called the Shadowlords. These foes have proved themselves to be extremely strong and hard to beat. As yet, no one knows where the Shadowlords came from, or why they remained hidden until now, but one thing is clear: if they conquer Embra, Earth will be next.

== Gameplay ==
Shadow Realms was designed as an episodic four-versus-one action role-playing game. Players would choose from six classes: Warrior, Assassin, Wizard, Cleric, Ranger, Warlock, or play against the Heroes as the Shadowlord. Each class featured special attacks, abilities, and strengths.

The game featured co-operative, third-person missions in an evolving world. Episodes would release frequently, adding new elements to the game. Players would also decide their paths through the story. Character and combat customization options progressed a Hero or Shadowlord to a player's style. This included guns, axes, and fireballs. Players could also mix abilities regardless of their class.

Four-player teams combated a fifth-player Shadowlord who controlled creatures, set traps, and changed the environment. Shadowlords remained unseen until they possessed a monster, cast a spell, or chose to reveal themselves.

== Development ==
Shadow Realms was first announced at the 2014 San Diego Comic-Con. At the event, BioWare released a live-action trailer entitled You've Been Chosen, and more trailers have followed since then.

Further information was revealed at Gamescom 2014, with the first gameplay video also being shown.

Shadow Realms was being developed by BioWare's Austin studio and was to have run on DICE's Frostbite 3 engine so that it may target Windows XP users. It was only being developed for Microsoft Windows, but BioWare Austin's general manager Jeff Hickman stated that the game may have been released on consoles if it was successful on PC and fans called for it.

The game's official website features developer blogs about the game, as well as a sign-up form for its closed alpha program.

In January 2015, sources suggested that the game was postponed and rebooted because of the failures of multiplayer video games such as the 2013 reboot of Command & Conquer and Dawngate. Sources also suggested that the game was to be released in 2017 for Microsoft Windows, PlayStation 4 and Xbox One. But on February 9, 2015, BioWare announced the game's cancellation to work on content for Dragon Age: Inquisition and Mass Effect: Andromeda.

== Reception and legacy ==
Shadow Realms received positive pre-release reception, with reviewers praising the game's customization options, tactics, and mix of magic and weapons in combat.

The game inspired a spiritual successor called Breach created by former developers of the studio, but that game was also cancelled shortly after its early access release on Steam.
