= Drum Show =

Single by Twenty One Pilots

from the album Breach
- Released: August 18, 2025
- Genre: Alternative rock; pop-punk; indie rock
- Length: 3:23
- Label: Fueled by Ramen
- Songwriters: Tyler Joseph; Paul Meany
- Producers: Tyler Joseph; Paul Meany

Twenty One Pilots singles chronology
| "The Contract" (2025) | "Drum Show" (2025) | "City Walls" (2025) |

Music video
- "Drum Show" on YouTube

"Drum Show" is a song by the American music duo Twenty One Pilots, released as the second single from their eighth studio album, Breach, on August 18, 2025.

== Composition and lyrics ==
Musically, "Drum Show" has been described as alternative rock, pop-punk, and indie rock. "Drum Show" is the first song to feature drummer Josh Dun on lead vocals, albeit partially. In an interview with Clash, Dun described "Drum Show" as an exploration of his life through Joseph's perspective, which he found "interesting".

== Release ==
"Drum Show" was announced as Breach's second single on August 14, 2025. It was released on August 18, 2025, four days after the announcement. Promotional clips for the music video would end with the text "8.18" flashing on-screen, referring to the date August 18, the date the single and music video were released.

== Music video ==
The music video for "Drum Show", directed by longtime collaborator Mark C. Eshleman, shows the duo performing in a parking garage in front of a van which seems to be powering the duo's instruments. They are also seen performing inside the van while Dun drives. As of March 21, 2026, the music video has over 14 million views on YouTube.

== Reception ==
"Drum Show" was well-received upon release. Kerrang! writer Emily Garner called it an "anthemic" single, and notes Dun gives "one hell of a performance".

=== Accolades ===
Year-end lists
| Publication | Accolade | Rank | Ref. |
|---|---|---|---|
| Jesus Freak Hideout | John DiBiase's Song Picks | 5 | |

== Credits and personnel ==
Adapted from Billboard and Tidal: (Note: Vocals are credited to "twenty one pilots" on streaming services, Joseph and Dun's vocal contributions are according to various news sources and its music video.)

=== Twenty One Pilots ===
- Tyler Joseph – lead vocals, guitar, bass, piano, keyboards, songwriting, production
- Josh Dun – drums, lead vocals (Note: Dun contributes lead vocals to "Drum Show" in its middle section.)

=== Additional personnel ===
- Paul Meany – production, songwriting
- Unnus Latif – drum technician, recording engineer
- Adam Hawkins – mixing
- Joe LaPorta – mastering

== Charts ==
Chart performance for "Drum Show"
| Chart (2025) | Peak position |
|---|---|
| Bolivia Anglo Airplay (Monitor Latino) | 12 |
| New Zealand Hot Singles (RMNZ) | 3 |
| UK Singles (OCC) | 90 |
| UK Christian Songs (Cross Rhythms) | 2 |
| US Bubbling Under Hot 100 (Billboard) | 13 |
| US Hot Rock & Alternative Songs (Billboard) | 21 |
