= Breech =

Breech may refer to:

- Breech (firearms), the opening at the rear of a gun barrel where the cartridge is inserted in a breech-loading weapon
- breech, the lower part of a pulley block
- breech, the penetration of a boiler where exhaust gases leave it
- breech birth, when the baby is born feet or bottom first
- breeches, an item of clothing covering the body from the waist down
- buttocks, or breech, the lower part of the human abdomen

== People with the surname ==
- Ernest R. Breech (1897–1978), American businessman, chairman of Ford Motor Company
- Jim Breech (born 1956), American football player

== See also ==
- Breach (disambiguation)
- Breeching (disambiguation)
