= Breach, Kent =

Coordinates: 51.185°N 1.145°E

Breach
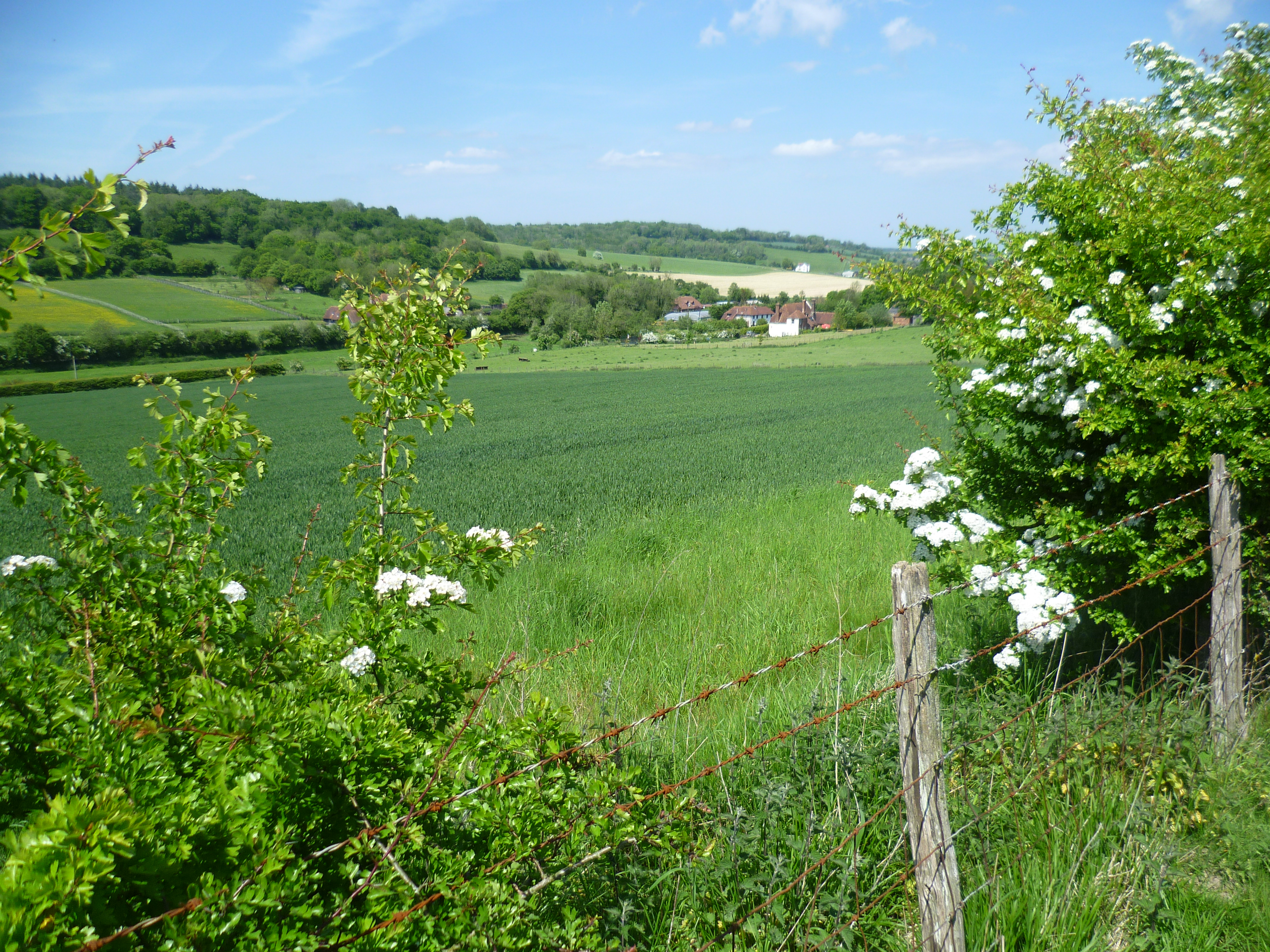
- View of Breach

- Location within Kent
- District: City of Canterbury
- Shire county: Kent
- Region: South East
- Country: England
- Sovereign state: United Kingdom
- Post town: Canterbury
- Postcode district: CT4 6
- Police: Kent
- Fire: Kent
- Ambulance: South East Coast
- UK Parliament: Canterbury

Breach is a small settlement in the Elham Valley about one mile (1.6 km) south of Barham (where, at the 2011 Census, the population was included) in Kent, England. It gives its name to nearby Barham Downs.
