= Breached (video game) =

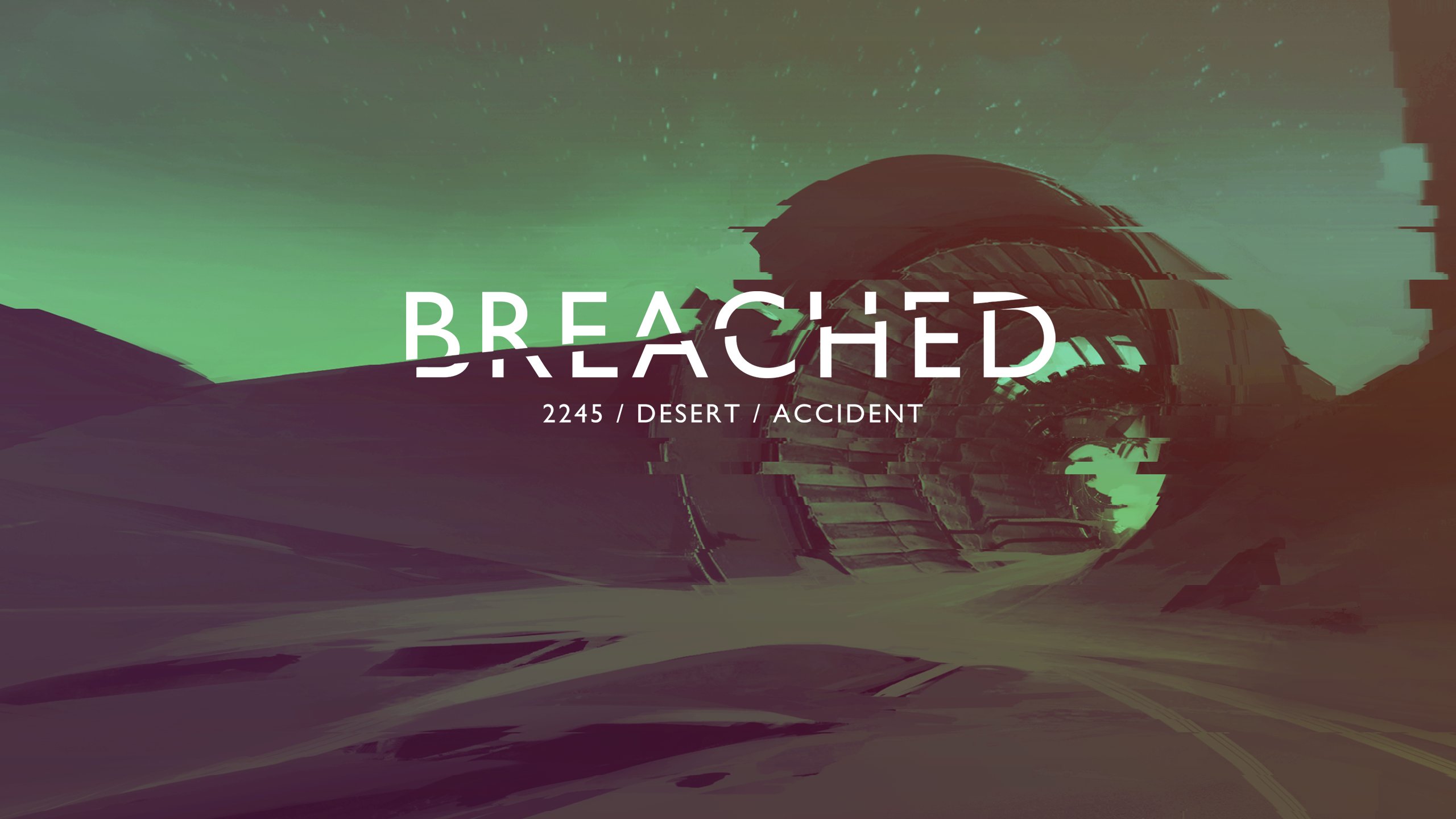
- Developer: Drama Drifters
- Publisher: Nkidu Games
- Platform: Microsoft Windows
- Release: Windows: WW: June 22, 2016
- Genres: Action, Puzzle
- Mode: Single-player

Breached is an action puzzle video game, developed Drama Drifters and published by Nkidu Games.

The game received mixed reviews from video game critics.

== Gameplay ==
Breached is an action puzzle video game. Set in 2245, players take the role of Corus Valott, who wakes up from cryogenic sleep to find his base destroyed.

== Development ==
Breached was developed by Drama Drifters and published by Nkidu Games. It was released on June 22, 2016.

== Reception ==
Reception

Aggregate score
Aggregator	Score
Metacritic	54/100

Review scores
Publication	Score
GameSpot	3/10
Polygon	6.5/10

Breached received mixed reception, with review aggregator Metacritic calculating an average score of 54 out of 100, based on 17 reviews.

Noah Caldwell-Gervais, writing for Polygon praised the game for its storytelling while criticizing the "triviality" of its gameplay.

Don Saas from GameSpot gave a negative review of the game, criticizing the controls and describing the mystery in the game as "shallow".

John Walker from Rock, Paper, Shotgun noted play-throughs of the game could last one or two hours.
