= Breach (cancelled video game) =

- Developer: QC Games
- Publisher: QC Games
- Platform: Windows
- Release: January 17, 2018
- Genre: Action RPG
- Mode: Multiplayer

Breach was an action role-playing game developed by American studio QC Games, a former studio of ex-BioWare and EA Games developers. The game was released on Steam Early Access on January 17, 2018, but its development was cancelled entirely on April 3, 2019, along with the closure of the studio itself. The game received mixed reviews from critics.

== Plot ==
The story of Breach involves a group of "modern-day mages" who attempt to prevent a magical apocalypse when monsters of legend emerge from portals known as "breaches".

== Gameplay ==
The gameplay of Breach is "a hybrid of dungeon crawling and Devil May Cry" with an "MMO-lite structure". The game is 4v1 asymmetrical multiplayer in which four players attempt to get through a dungeon while a fifth controls a "Veil Demon" that can possess enemies, traps and boss monsters inside the dungeon. It had 18 playable classes.

== Development ==
The concept for Breach initially came from Shadow Realms, a planned BioWare Austin game that was unveiled in 2014 but cancelled by EA due to a "change in strategy" away from free-to-play games. Breach initially had an upfront cost, but was planned to eventually be free-to-play, though the game's designer stated that it would not be "pay to win". QC Games announced it was closing on April 3, 2019, ostensibly due to lack of funding, though they did not cite a specific reason for the shutdown.

== Reception ==
Breach garnered mixed reviews on Steam, with detractors citing crashes and framerate problems that resulted in the game being a "laggy mess", as well as the game's microtransaction system.
