= Tyler Joseph =

American musician (born 1988)

- Joseph performing with Twenty One Pilots in 2026
- Born: Tyler Robert Joseph; December 1, 1988 (age 37); Columbus, Ohio, U.S.
- Occupations: Singer; rapper; songwriter; musician; record producer
- Years active: 2007–present
- Works: Discography; songs recorded
- Spouse: Jenna Black (m. 2015)
- Children: 3
- Awards: Full list
- Musical career
- Genres: Alternative hip hop; electropop; indie pop; pop rock; rap rock; reggae; alternative rock
- Instruments: Vocals; keyboards; ukulele; bass; guitar; sampler
- Labels: Fueled by Ramen; Elektra; WEA International; Atlantic
- Member of: Twenty One Pilots
- Website: twentyonepilots.com

Tyler Robert Joseph (born December 1, 1988) is an American singer, rapper, songwriter, musician, and record producer best known as the frontman of the musical duo Twenty One Pilots alongside bandmate Josh Dun. He has recorded nine albums: one solo, and eight with Twenty One Pilots. As part of the duo, he has been nominated for six Grammy Awards, of which he has won one, for "Stressed Out."

== Early life ==
Tyler Robert Joseph was born on December 1, 1988, in Columbus, Ohio, to Christopher Anthony Joseph and Kelly Joseph (née Stryker). He has two younger brothers and a younger sister. His mother was a math teacher in the Olentangy school district before being named Olentangy Orange High School's basketball coach in 2013. His father was born to a Lebanese father and an American mother and was a coach at Worthington Christian High School from 1996 to 2005, as well as being a former school principal.

Joseph was homeschooled in his childhood. His first real exposure to music was the Christian rap rock group DC Talk, and one of Joseph's favorite bands is indie rock band The Killers. Joseph cites Canadian actor and comedian Jim Carrey as another influence, saying that Carrey "helped raise me". Joseph played basketball from a very young age and went on to play point guard for Worthington Christian. In 2008, the varsity basketball team placed second in the Division IV state tournament. Future Twenty One Pilots bassist Nick Thomas also played on the same team as Joseph, the pair having performed "The Star-Spangled Banner" together at one of their games.

After seeing a songwriter perform at a High Street Club, he rejected an opportunity to play basketball at Otterbein University along with a scholarship to the university. He began playing music after finding an old keyboard in his closet, a Christmas gift from his mother, and began to mimic various radio melodies. From around 2007 to 2008, Joseph recorded a solo project titled No Phun Intended in his basement. It was later revealed that Thomas contributed guitar to several songs on the album.

Among Joseph's first performances with Twenty One Pilots, he recounts that his mother would often stand outside Ohio State University giving away tickets to his shows. "She'd be like, 'Come see my son play music'", Joseph says.

== Career ==
=== 2007–2009: No Phun Intended ===
Between 2007 and 2008, before assembling the band Twenty One Pilots, Joseph recorded a variety of songs. On November 30, 2008, Joseph uploaded six of these songs to his PureVolume account, titling the release No Phun Intended. The album was recorded in Joseph's senior year of high school from 2007 to 2008, in his basement. The six tracks were "Taken by Sleep", "Drown", "Tonight", "Save", "Hole in the Ground", and "Blasphemy" in that order. Some of Joseph's earlier music has been reworked into Twenty One Pilots recordings. It was later revealed that aside from Joseph, bassist Nick Thomas contributed guitar to several songs. The song "Save" off the release, was redone and released as a free download for some time on Twenty One Pilots' official website before it was pulled.

The project became unavailable in 2015, and PureVolume itself shut down in 2018.

=== 2009–present: Twenty One Pilots ===
Twenty One Pilots was formed in 2009 in Columbus, Ohio and consisted of frontman Joseph, bassist Thomas, and drummer Chris Salih; the latter two left the band in 2011.

On December 29, 2009, they released their debut, self-titled album and began touring Ohio, followed by their second album, Regional at Best in 2011, which consisted only of Joseph and newly recruited drummer Josh Dun.

Twenty One Pilots' third full-length album, Vessel, was released on January 8, 2013. They also embarked on a tour in support of the album, in which they named the "Quiet Is Violent World Tour".

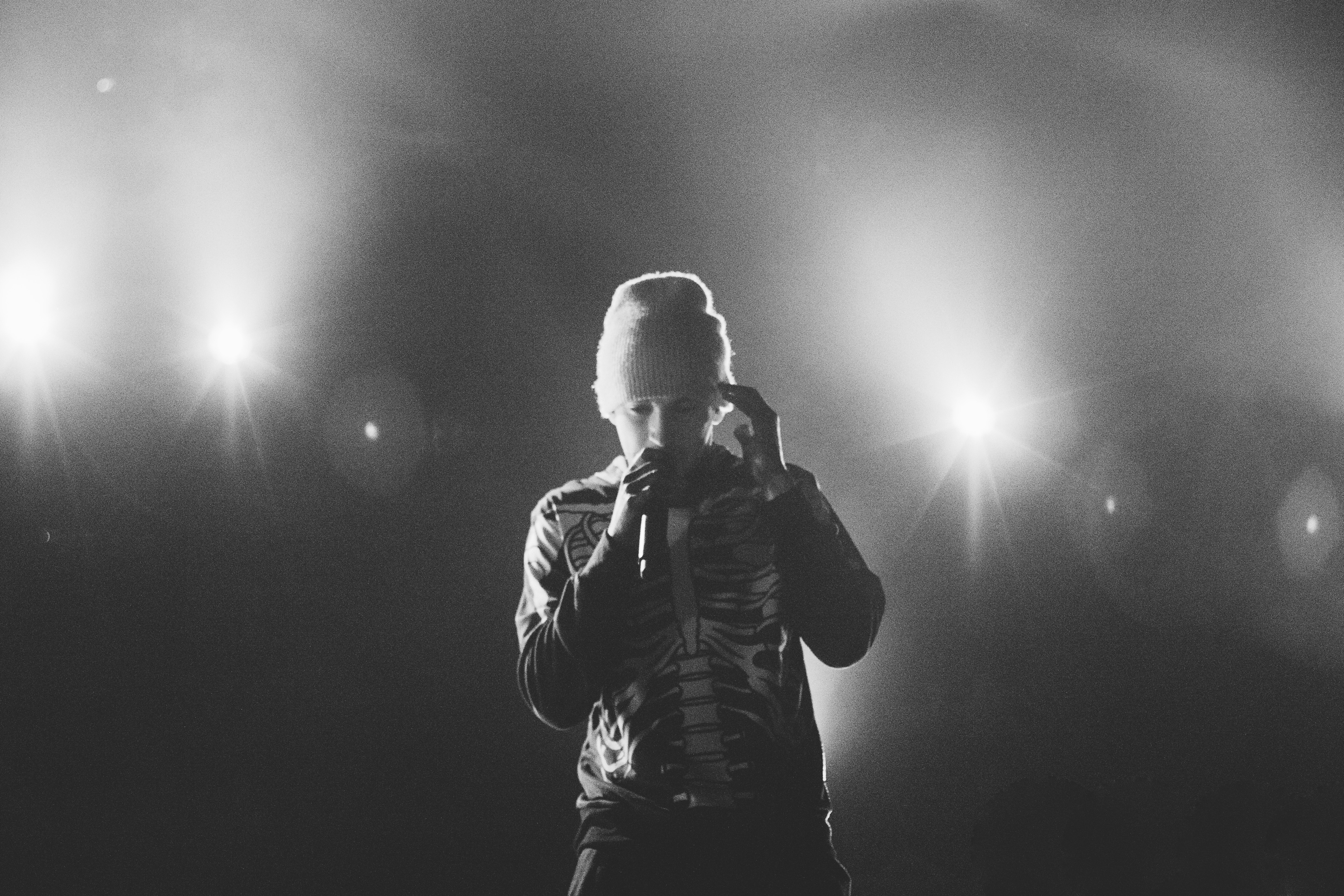
Joseph performing with Twenty One Pilots in October 2014

On March 17, 2015, the band announced their fourth album's title, Blurryface, and unveiled its track listing and release date. The band's fans crashed their website attempting to pre-order the album. The album was released on May 17, 2015, two days ahead of its intended release date. Joseph and drummer Josh Dun embarked on two international tours in 2015 and 2016: the Blurryface Tour and Emotional Roadshow World Tour. At the 59th Annual Grammy Awards, the duo won the award for Best Pop Duo/Group Performance.

On July 11, 2018, the band announced the release date of their fifth studio album, Trench, which was released on October 5, 2018. A world tour, called The Bandito Tour, began on October 16, 2018, as well. On July 25, 2018, a music video for the song "Nico and the Niners" was released, as a second addition to a three part music video series, regarding Tyler Joseph's fictional city, "Dema". A 10-second snippet of the song "My Blood" was played at the end of a commercial for Trench during the 2018 VMAs on August 20. On August 27, 2018, a Twitter user leaked the full song onto his Twitter account in low quality, after they found that it could be played on their Apple HomePod. The leak was confirmed real when the band made the song available on streaming services later that day as the album's fourth single. The audio was uploaded onto YouTube on the same day, which shows singer Tyler Joseph in his home studio playing the song's bass line. A music video for the song was released on October 5, 2018, the day of the album's release.

Joseph performing with Twenty One Pilots in 2026

On April 9, 2020, the band released a new single "Level of Concern". The song's lyrics reference the anxiety during the COVID-19 pandemic, with the accompanying music video for the track filmed in Joseph and Dun's homes while they were under lockdown due to the U.S. state and local government responses to the COVID-19 pandemic. Joseph directed a portion of the song's proceeds to Crew Nation, a charity for live music crews who cannot be paid during the international quarantine.

On December 8, 2020, Twenty One Pilots released a Christmas song, titled "Christmas Saves the Year", during a Twitch livestream hosted by Joseph. Originally, Joseph was reluctant to write a Christmas song, although he said that he was inspired by the fact he was "experiencing Christmas through a little girl's perspective". The sound of the track was inspired by a musical instrument called the Mellotron.

The duo's sixth studio album, Scaled and Icy, was released on May 21, 2021.

The duo's seventh studio album, Clancy, was released on May 24, 2024, nine years after the release of their breakthrough album Blurryface. The lead single for the album, "Overcompensate", was released on February 29, 2024. On March 18, Joseph announced that each song on the album would have an accompanying music video, with all of them having been released alongside the album.

On May 21, 2025, the duo announced their eighth studio album, Breach, for release in September. Its lead single, "The Contract", was released on June 12, accompanied by a music video. On July 15, Joseph posted a video to many of his social media accounts that showed him writing the tracklist for the upcoming album. On August 18, "Drum Show", the second single from Breach, was released. Similarly to "The Contract", this release was also accompanied by a music video. Breach was released on September 12, with the third single, "City Walls", and its music video released on the same day.

=== Other ventures ===
In 2010, Joseph was featured on the song "Live" by the hip hop artist and rapper Joseph Michael Langston (better known by his stage name Jocef, or sometimes as Jocef Michael), who is a friend of Joseph's from college, along with two other rappers, Juda and Alon. The song is the opening track to Jocef's debut album, In Search of: L.O.V.E. The track was co-written by Tyler Joseph and Jocef. Jocef eventually returned the favor a year later by being featured on the song "Be Concerned" off of Twenty One Pilots' 2011 album Regional at Best.

In 2011, Joseph performed a leading role in Five14 Church's three episode mockumentary titled "The (moderately inspiring tale of the) Longboard Rodeo Tango". According to the mockumentary, Joseph was an intern at the church at the time.

In 2012, Joseph was featured in an Internet-use awareness video titled "What's Your Story?" The video was produced and directed by Mark C. Eshleman, a regular collaborator for Twenty One Pilots, for Trend Micro's annual Where Are You Contest. The room used in the video is the same room in which the original music video for "House of Gold" was filmed.

On December 24, 2013, Christmas Eve, Joseph participated and sang "O Come, O Come, Emmanuel" at Five14 Church's Christmas with the Stars in New Albany, Ohio. The official video of the performance was uploaded to YouTube on February 14, 2014. He also performed a magic segment with the church's host and emcee David McCreary for the show.

In 2014, Joseph also contributed to a few tracks for Five14 Church's worship album Clear by the gospel rock band New Albany Music, led by Travis Whittaker. Joseph appears on four tracks out of 13 in total. Additionally, another single was recorded, titled "Dead Come Alive".

In December 2014, Joseph contributed backing vocals to the song "Sickly Sweet Holidays" by Dallon Weekes (then-bassist of Panic! at the Disco). Joseph initially had an entire verse in the song, but it was excluded due to Joseph's label.

Joseph assisted in much of the production of singer Shania Twain's sixth studio album Queen of Me, and is a writer on the last song, "The Hardest Stone" as well. On September 12, 2023, Jon Foreman posted a cover of "Stressed Out" on social media along with an announcement that Joseph would be covering his band Switchfoot's song "Twenty-Four". Joseph later described The Beautiful Letdown as one of his "favorite albums of all time," something that he would listen to "over and over again."

In 2025, Joseph co-founded an independent record label named Arro, alongside Twenty One Pilots manager Chris Woltman.

== Personal life ==
In 2014, with regards to religion, Joseph said:

I still believe in God, I still want to call myself a Christian—because I am a Christian. I don't know how to talk to people about it yet. And if I can't talk to other people about it yet or if I don't know exactly why I should talk to other people about it, does it really mean anything to me, then? If I don't truly have the answer, shouldn't I just be talking about that? But I have to get there first.

Joseph has a three-part tattoo that represents "something that saved his life". Joseph has been specific about the fact that he does not want the meaning of his tattoos spread on the Internet. However, he has stated a few times that he is willing to tell people one-on-one if they decide to ask him in person. Both Joseph and his bandmate Josh Dun have an "X" tattooed on themselves to represent their dedication to their hometown fans. They received it on stage during their hometown show at the Lifestyle Communities Pavilion on April 26, 2013. Joseph's is located on his right bicep and Dun's is located on his neck behind his right ear. Joseph also sports the name "Josh" on his right thigh, which he received from Dun onstage during a show at the Eagles Ballroom in Milwaukee, Wisconsin on October 30, 2015. Joseph is a fan of the Ohio State Buckeyes. His favorite film is Donnie Darko (2001).

In mid-January 2015, Joseph served at former bandmate Chris Salih's wedding as an attendant, alongside Twenty One Pilots producer Mark Eshleman.

Joseph married Jenna Black on March 28, 2015, after they got engaged on July 8, 2014. The two have three children together; two daughters, Rosie and Junie, and a son, Tommy.

Joseph is a firm advocate of mental health awareness and suicide prevention, considering the fetishisation of the 27 Club "dangerous", a topic that he explored in the Twenty One Pilots song "Neon Gravestones", which he spoke on, saying "I was afraid of that song... so that song is very black and white. I slaved over every pronoun. Because I knew that it was a sensitive topic, the last thing I needed was for someone to misunderstand what I was trying to say". In another interview, he elaborated further: "I just knew that it had to be that way. I knew we had to say exactly what we meant. We didn't want to come up with beautiful, pretty metaphors that could distract from the importance of the topic". In response to fan sentiment that Twenty One Pilots had "saved their life", Joseph said "I don't take lightly when someone says a song helped them through something. That's not a statistic to me. It's a person. The relationship we have with our fans feels less like "audience/artist" and more like co-authors. They finish the sentences we start. Thank you for letting our songs sit with you in the dark until morning".

Joseph is also a supporter of the Black Lives Matter movement, calling racism evil. He is an ally of the LGBTQ+ community. Joseph is strongly opposed to the use and practice of artificially generated artwork, on which he has said "it sucks, but we may have crossed in to a 'proof of work' era. Keep the receipts [and] record the process."

== Discography ==
=== Solo ===
- No Phun Intended (2008)

=== Twenty One Pilots ===
- Twenty One Pilots (2009)
- Regional at Best (2011)
- Vessel (2013)
- Blurryface (2015)
- Trench (2018)
- Scaled and Icy (2021)
- Clancy (2024)
- Breach (2025)

=== With other artists ===
List of songs Tyler Joseph is featured on
Title	Year	Album	Vocalist	Writer	Producer	Notes
"Dollhouse" (Tyler Joseph and Jocef)	2009	Unreleased	Yes	Yes	Yes	This project was recorded during Joseph's brief time in college alongside classmate Joseph Michael Langston.
"Live" (Jocef featuring Juda, Alon and Tyler J)	2010	In Search of: L.O.V.E.	Yes	Yes	No	Recorded during college between Joseph and Jocef, a Christian rapper.
"Rulers of Reverse" (Whittaker featuring Tyler Joseph)	2014	Clear	Yes	Yes	No	A worship album created by Travis Whittaker (known simply as "Whittaker") and the gospel band "New Albany Music" for the church "Five14" of which Joseph interned at. Joseph is featured in four out of thirteen tracks on the album Clear.
"Twenty-Nine" (Whittaker featuring Tyler Joseph)	2014	Clear	Yes	Yes	No	A worship album created by Travis Whittaker (known simply as "Whittaker") and the gospel band "New Albany Music" for the church "Five14" of which Joseph interned at. Joseph is featured in four out of thirteen tracks on the album Clear.
"Lord of Glory" (Whittaker featuring Tyler Joseph)	2014	Clear	Yes	Yes	No	A worship album created by Travis Whittaker (known simply as "Whittaker") and the gospel band "New Albany Music" for the church "Five14" of which Joseph interned at. Joseph is featured in four out of thirteen tracks on the album Clear.
"Producer" (Whittaker featuring Tyler Joseph)	2014	Clear	Yes	Yes	No	A worship album created by Travis Whittaker (known simply as "Whittaker") and the gospel band "New Albany Music" for the church "Five14" of which Joseph interned at. Joseph is featured in four out of thirteen tracks on the album Clear.
"Dead Come Alive" (Whittaker featuring Tyler Joseph)	2014	Non-album single	Yes	Yes	No	This song does not appear on the Clear album but was still recorded with Whittaker.
"Sickly Sweet Holidays" (Dallon Weekes featuring Tyler Joseph)	2014	Xmas Jambz	Yes	No	No	In December 2014, Joseph contributed backing vocals to the song "Sickly Sweet Holidays" by Dallon Weekes (then-bassist of Panic! at the Disco). Joseph initially had an entire verse in the song, but it was excluded due to Joseph's label. The song was originally released as a single but then placed on Weekes' Christmas EP, Xmas Jambz.
"The Hardest Stone" (Shania Twain featuring Tyler Joseph)	2023	Queen of Me	No	Yes	Yes	On "The Hardest Stone", Joseph served as a co-writer, producer, and vocal engineer. He also assisted with production on other tracks within Queen of Me. Alongside Joseph, frequent collaborator Paul Meany served as a co-producer on track 12.
"Twenty-Four" (Switchfoot cover)	2023	The Beautiful Letdown (Our Version) [Deluxe Edition]	Yes	No	Yes	On September 12, 2023, Jon Foreman posted a cover of "Stressed Out" on social media along with an announcement that Joseph would be covering his band Switchfoot's song "Twenty-Four". Joseph later described The Beautiful Letdown as one of his "favorite albums of all time," something that he would listen to "over and over again."

== Filmography ==
Year	Title	Role	Ref.
2022	Twenty One Pilots: Cinema Experience	Himself	
2026	Twenty One Pilots: More Than We Ever Imagined	Himself	

== Awards and nominations ==
Year	Ceremony	Award	Nominated	Result	Ref.
2017	59th Annual Grammy Awards	Record of the Year	"Stressed Out" (as performer and producer)	Nominated	
2017	59th Annual Grammy Awards	Best Pop Duo/Group Performance	"Stressed Out" (as performer)	Won	
2017	59th Annual Grammy Awards	Best Rock Performance	"Heathens" (as performer)	Nominated	
2017	59th Annual Grammy Awards	Best Song Written for Visual Media	"Heathens" (as songwriter)	Nominated	
2017	59th Annual Grammy Awards	Best Rock Song	"Heathens" (as songwriter)	Nominated	
2019	61st Annual Grammy Awards	Best Rock Song	"Jumpsuit" (as songwriter)	Nominated	

== See also ==
- List of songs recorded by Twenty One Pilots
