= Breach (Twenty One Pilots album) =

2025 studio album by Twenty One Pilots

Studio album by Twenty One Pilots
- Released: September 12, 2025
- Genres: Alternative rock; pop rock; electropop; alternative hip-hop
- Length: 47:23
- Label: Fueled by Ramen
- Producers: Tyler Joseph; Paul Meany; Mike Elizondo

Twenty One Pilots chronology
Clancy (2024)	Breach (2025)

Singles from Breach
- 1. "The Contract" Released: June 12, 2025; 2. "Drum Show" Released: August 18, 2025; 3. "City Walls" Released: September 12, 2025

Singles from Breach (Digital Remains)
- 1. "Drag Path" Released: February 17, 2026

Breach is the eighth studio album by the American musical duo Twenty One Pilots, released on September 12, 2025, through Fueled by Ramen. It is a follow-up to the duo's previous album, Clancy (2024), and concludes a conceptual series also consisting of Blurryface (2015), Trench (2018), and Scaled and Icy (2021). Primarily written by vocalist Tyler Joseph and co-produced with Paul Meany and Mike Elizondo, the album received positive reviews from critics and was a commercial success, becoming the duo's second record to debut atop the Billboard 200, and the biggest opening week vinyl sales for a rock album since tracking began in 1991.

== Background and promotion ==
Logo for Breach

On May 21, 2025, nearly a year since the release of their previous studio album, Clancy (2024), Twenty One Pilots announced a follow-up titled Breach. The announcement followed a series of cryptic clues and Easter eggs shared across social media and during the final shows of The Clancy World Tour. Among these Easter eggs were several bits of morse code scattered throughout the final letters of the Fan Premiere Exhibits.

Breach continued the narrative arcs established in their previous works, particularly Blurryface (2015), Trench (2018), Scaled and Icy (2021), and Clancy. The duo stated that the album would serve as the final installment in their decade-long "lore" first established in Blurryface, alluding to "Paladin Strait"—the closing track of Clancy—whose music video had acted as a cliff-hanger. Tyler Joseph previously teased the record in an interview, stating they were entering a "gap of nothingness" he could only describe as "not nothing".

The artwork depicts the duo dressed in mostly black attire, similar to the cover art of Clancy, further supporting the idea of a continued narrative. In announcing the album, Twenty One Pilots revealed that the lead single, "The Contract", would be released on June 12, 2025. Following the announcement, the first pressings of Breach on vinyl and CD became available for pre-order. The album was released on September 12. On July 15, the album's track listing was revealed. The second single, "Drum Show", was released on August 18, with "City Walls" following as the third on the parent album's release date. "City Walls" was accompanied by a music video, which was described by Joseph as "the end of [the lore]". On the same day, the band released Breach – Digital Remains, an online-only time-limited collection of new photos and "artifacts" in relation to the making of the album that includes a bonus song, "Drag Path"; an abridged cut of that song was released to streaming platforms as a single on February 17, 2026, after it went viral on TikTok.

A 23-show North American concert tour, The Clancy Tour: Breach, was announced alongside the release of "The Contract". As an extension of the Clancy World Tour and supporting both Clancy and Breach, it commenced on September 18, 2025, in Cincinnati, Ohio, and concluded on October 26 in Los Angeles, California. This is being followed by a series of headlining performances at festivals across the Americas and Europe between January and November 2026, along with a one-off concert at Ohio Stadium in the duo's hometown of Columbus, Ohio on October 17.

== Composition ==
Breach is primarily an alternative rock, pop rock, electropop, and alternative hip-hop album with elements of synth-pop, post-punk, rap rock, pop-punk, emo, hip-hop, and hyperpop. The album was co-produced with longtime collaborator Paul Meany, and incorporates callbacks to the duo's previous albums, both lyrically and sonically. Breach also experiments with electronic textures, major and minor scales, key changes, tempo changes, and subdued, piano-based arrangements.

It is the duo's first album to feature drummer Josh Dun on lead vocals, with him singing the bridge of "Drum Show". He had previously sung background vocals on three songs on Blurryface, as well as certain songs during live performances. In an interview with Clash, Dun described "Drum Show" as an exploration of his life through Joseph's perspective, which he found "interesting". The last song of the album, "Intentions", is a backmasked version of the song "Truce" (the last song from the band's 2013 major-label debut album, Vessel).

== Critical reception ==
Breach ratings
Review scores
Source	Rating
AllMusic	3.5/5 stars
The Arts Desk	4/5 stars
Clash	8/10
Dork	4/5
Jesus Freak Hideout	4/5 stars
Louder Sound	4/5 stars
Pitchfork	6.2/10
Sputnikmusic	2.8/5
Square One	5/5 stars

The album received generally positive reviews from critics. Neil Z. Yeung of AllMusic wrote, "For those diehard fans who have been consumed by the deep... lore, Breach will be a satisfying hit that adds fuel to the fire of the fandom." Tom Carr, writing for The Arts Desk, called the album "earnest and often captivating". Billboard's Jason Lipshutz wrote that Breach offered some of the duo's "most bruising riffs and immediate hooks to date," climaxing with the centerpiece standout "Downstairs". Amrit Virdi of Clash praised Breach as a strong and appropriate conclusion to the duo's conceptual series, highlighting its lyrical callbacks, varied instrumentation, and maturity in sound. Dan Harrison of Dork praised the mixing and the sound of the album writing, "Rock provides backbone, synths add lift, rap cadences appear where they fit a phrase rather than as a badge. When it clicks, you get that signature blend: choruses both grounded and weightless, drums demanding motion while melodies hold poise."

Josh Balogh of Jesus Freak Hideout called it "thrilling, uncomfortable, and necessary" and "a soundscape that refuses closure, demanding attention with nearly every turn." Vicky Greer of Louder Sound wrote, "Breach may be a celebratory goodbye for the most diehard fans, but those who are less involved in the story of Clancy... won't feel left out – it's still an album chock-full of Twenty One Pilots' showstopping theatricality." In a mixed-to-positive review, Hannah Jocelyn of Pitchfork called Breach a "maximalist pop-rock record that no one else could make, mostly because no one else would consider it." She also called the duo's "attempts at hip-hop frustrating". Caleb Robinson of Sputnikmusic wrote, "despite a few standouts, Breach largely feels disappointing and rushed, and fails to deliver a worthy conclusion to the band’s ongoing storytelling." Kayla Kerridge of Square One Magazine wrote, "With fearless experimentation and unflinching vulnerability, Joseph and Dun have created one of their most cohesive and lasting works yet."

== Commercial performance ==
In the United States, Breach debuted at number one on the Billboard 200 with 200,000 album-equivalent units, consisting of 40.68 million on-demand streams and 169,000 pure album copies. It marked Twenty One Pilots' second number-one album in the country, following Blurryface, and the biggest opening week of their career, besting Trench. Breach also registered the largest debut for any rock album on the Billboard 200 since Tool's Fear Inoculum (2019), as well as the largest vinyl sales week for a rock album since tracking started in 1991. All thirteen tracks from the album charted within the top 40 of the US Hot Rock & Alternative Songs chart.

Breach entered the OCC UK Albums Update at number two before its initial chart entry, but debuted at number four on the UK Albums Chart. On the ARIA Albums Chart, it debuted at number two, making it their fourth consecutive top three album in Australia. The album debuted at number one in Scotland, Hungary, Croatia and the Netherlands.

== Accolades ==
Year-end lists
Publication	Accolade	Rank	Ref.
Jesus Freak Hideout	Top Albums of 2025 Staff Average	7	
Kerrang!	The 50 Best Albums of 2025	9	

== Track listing ==
All tracks are written by Tyler Joseph, with additional writers noted; all tracks are produced by Joseph and Paul Meany, except where noted.

Breach track listing
No.	Title	Writer(s)	Producer(s)	Length
1.	"City Walls"	Paul Meany		5:22
2.	"Rawfear"			3:22
3.	"Drum Show"	Meany		3:23
4.	"Garbage"		Joseph; Meany; Mike Elizondo	3:16
5.	"The Contract"	Meany; Dominic Harrison; Matt Schwartz		3:45
6.	"Downstairs"			5:26
7.	"Robot Voices"	Shane Becker; Rahul Chakraborty; Joey Hayden; Shane Hogan; Jackson Matteucci; Maximilian Mena	Joseph; Elizondo; Becker^{[a]}	3:57
8.	"Center Mass"	Daniel Fasano	Joseph; Meany; Fasano^{[a]}	3:48
9.	"Cottonwood"			3:08
10.	"One Way"	Chris Smith	Joseph; Meany; Risc^{[a]}	2:43
11.	"Days Lie Dormant"	Meany		3:26
12.	"Tally"	Drew Fulk	Joseph; Meany; Wzrd Bld^{[a]}	3:32
13.	"Intentions"			2:15
Total length:				47:23

Digital Remains – bonus track
No.	Title	Length
14.	"Drag Path"	5:04
Total length:		52:27

=== Notes ===
- ^{^[a]} indicates an additional producer.
- "City Walls" contains a sample of "Heavydirtysoul" and an interpolation of "Holding On to You", both by Twenty One Pilots.
- "Rawfear" is stylized in all caps.
- "Downstairs" is a reworking of an unreleased demo from the duo's 2011 album Regional at Best, often referred to as "Korea".
- "Robot Voices" contains an interpolation of "My Soft Spots My Robots", written by Jackson Matteucci, Rahul Chakraborty, Shane Hagan, Joey Hayden and Maximilian Mena.
- The instrumental of "Intentions" is a backmasked version of "Truce", the closing track of the duo's major-label debut, Vessel (2013).

== Personnel ==
Credits adapted from Tidal.

Twenty One Pilots

- Tyler Joseph – lead and backing vocals, bass, piano, keyboards, guitar, programming, samples, ukulele (8), synthesizers, production, executive production
- Josh Dun – drums, percussion, drum engineering, vocals (3), outro (10)

Additional contributors

- Paul Meany – production
- Adam Hawkins – mixing
- Joe LaPorta – mastering
- Unnus Latif – drum engineering
- Chris Woltman – executive production
- Mike Elizondo – production, keyboards (4, 7); electric bass, group vocals, drum programming, electric guitar (7)
- Justin Francis – engineering (4, 7)
- Cole Elizondo – backing vocals (7)
- Grace Elizondo – backing vocals (7)
- Lily Elizondo – backing vocals (7)
- Sophie Elizondo – backing vocals (7)
- Alex Wilder – engineering assistance (7)
- Erica Block – engineering assistance (7)
- Junie Joseph, Rosie Joseph – screams (2)

== Charts ==
=== Weekly charts ===
Weekly chart performance for Breach
Chart (2025)	Peak position
Australian Albums (ARIA)	2
Austrian Albums (Ö3 Austria)	2
Belgian Albums (Ultratop Flanders)	3
Belgian Albums (Ultratop Wallonia)	3
Canadian Albums (Billboard)	3
Croatian International Albums (HDU)	1
Czech Albums (ČNS IFPI)	4
Danish Albums (Hitlisten)	24
Dutch Albums (Album Top 100)	1
Finnish Albums (Suomen virallinen lista)	23
French Albums (SNEP)	5
French Rock & Metal Albums (SNEP)	2
German Albums (Offizielle Top 100)	2
German Pop Albums (Offizielle Top 100)	2
Greek Albums (IFPI)	69
Hungarian Albums (MAHASZ)	1
Icelandic Albums (Tónlistinn)	14
Irish Albums (Official Charts)	4
Italian Albums (FIMI)	3
Japanese Download Albums (Billboard Japan)	60
Lithuanian Albums (AGATA)	16
New Zealand Albums (RMNZ)	4
Norwegian Albums (IFPI Norge)	35
Polish Albums (ZPAV)	3
Portuguese Albums (AFP)	4
Scottish Albums (Official Charts)	1
Slovak Albums (ČNS IFPI)	8
Spanish Albums (PROMUSICAE)	9
Swedish Albums (Sverigetopplistan)	11
Swiss Albums (Schweizer Hitparade)	3
UK Albums (Official Charts)	4
US Billboard 200	1
US Top Rock & Alternative Albums (Billboard)	1

=== Year-end charts ===
Year-end chart performance for Breach
Chart (2025)	Position
Austrian Albums (Ö3 Austria)	66
Croatian International Albums (HDU)	11
US Billboard 200	194

== Certifications ==
Certifications for Breach
Region	Certification	Certified units/sales
United Kingdom (BPI)	Silver	60,000^{‡}
^{‡} Sales+streaming figures based on certification alone.
