= Stressed Out =

2015 single by Twenty One Pilots

Single by Twenty One Pilots

from the album Blurryface
- Released: April 28, 2015
- Recorded: 2014
- Studio: Can Am Recording (Los Angeles); Livingston Studios (London)
- Genre: Alternative hip hop; alternative rock; rap rock
- Length: 3:22
- Label: Fueled by Ramen
- Songwriter: Tyler Joseph
- Producer: Mike Elizondo

Twenty One Pilots singles chronology
| "Tear in My Heart" (2015) | "Stressed Out" (2015) | "Lane Boy" (2015) |

Music video
- "Stressed Out" on YouTube

"Stressed Out" is a song written and recorded by American musical duo Twenty One Pilots. Produced by Mike Elizondo and recorded at studios in Los Angeles and London, it was released as a promotional single from their fourth studio album, Blurryface (2015), on April 28, 2015, through Fueled by Ramen. The song later impacted US contemporary hit radio as the album's fourth official single on November 10. Elizondo initially took issue with the nature of the song's lyrical content, but relaxed after lead vocalist and songwriter Tyler Joseph explained the larger album concept.

"Stressed Out" is a midtempo alternative hip-hop, alternative rock and rap rock song with elements of psychedelic music. The track is built from synths and a Caribbean-style keyboard line alongside rapping vocals by Joseph. Lyrically, it addresses the end of adolescence, touching on insecurities and millennial angst while also discussing life challenges. Throughout the song, Joseph personifies the album's titular character, Blurryface, whose self-deprecating lyrics express self-doubt and anxiety, stressing over personal issues ranging from his music to the idea of becoming an adult.

An accompanying music video was directed by Mark Eshleman and primarily filmed at drummer Josh Dun's home in Columbus, Ohio. It features a mixture of surreal visuals and existential scenes while portraying the duo riding tricycles for a playdate and attempting to relive their childhood. In the video, black paint can be seen on the neck and hands of Joseph, referencing the character Blurryface.

Upon its release, "Stressed Out" received favorable reviews from contemporary music critics. The song was a sleeper hit, peaking at number two on the US Billboard Hot 100, giving the duo their first top ten hit in the US. The song topped the US Billboard Hot Rock Songs for a record 23 weeks. It also peaked at number one on the Billboard Adult Top 40, Rock Airplay, and Mainstream Top 40. It also led Twenty One Pilots to become the first rock act to have a song reach a billion streams on Spotify. "Stressed Out" was certified 13× platinum by the Recording Industry Association of America (RIAA) for sales of over thirteen million copies. The song reached the top five on charts in Australia, Austria, Belgium, Canada, the Czech Republic, Ecuador, France, Germany, Ireland, Israel, Mexico, the Netherlands, New Zealand, Portugal, Russia, Slovakia, and Switzerland. At the 59th Annual Grammy Awards, "Stressed Out" was nominated for Record of the Year and Best Pop Duo/Group Performance, winning the latter.

== Background and production ==
"Stressed Out" is a focal point for the thematic elements of the duo's second major-label studio album, Blurryface (2015), acting as an introduction to the "Blurryface". It was written by Tyler Joseph from the perspective of the character Blurryface rather than an impersonal third-person narrator. Blurryface appears as the alter-ego of Joseph, "a monster-image of his insecurities and self-hatreds", and on "Stressed Out" Joseph attempts to defeat it. In an interview with MTV News, Joseph elaborated on the Blurryface, saying "it's a guy that kind of represents all the things that I as an individual — but also everyone around me — am insecure about. When I think about insecurities and my insecurities are getting the best of me, the things that I think of are kind of a feeling of suffocation and then also the things that I create with my hands... Very dramatic, I know, but it helps me get into that character".

"Stressed Out" was produced by Mike Elizondo and recorded at Can Am in Los Angeles, California and at Livingston Studios in London, England. The track was then mixed at the Casita in Hollywood, California. During its recording, Elizondo had but one grievance in regards to the song. Speaking with front-man and principal songwriter Tyler Joseph, he opined that to the average listener, its lyrical content would come off as esoteric. Elizondo recalled: "So I had a good conversation with him trying to say, 'Hey, maybe you should change that; it's a great melody, it's a big hook of the song, but I just don't know what it means." He soon relaxed on the issue after Joseph provided an explanation of the larger album concept.

== Composition ==
"Stressed Out" is a mid-tempo alternative hip hop, alternative rock and rap rock song that runs for a duration of three minutes and twenty-two seconds. The musical composition has a throwback to rock music and psychedelic pop while maintaining clear pop sensibilities. According to the sheet music published at Musicnotes.com by Alfred Music, it is written in the time signature of common time, with a moderate tempo of 85 beats per minute. "Stressed Out" is composed in the key of A minor, while Tyler Joseph's vocal range spans one octave and four notes, from a low of E_{3} to a high of A_{4}. The song has a basic sequence of F–Dm–Am in the verses, pre-chorus and outro, changes to Am–G–C–E at the refrain and follows Am–G–C_{5}–E during the bridge as its chord progression.

"Stressed Out"
"Stressed Out" is an alternative hip hop and rap rock song with a throwback to rock music and psychedelic pop which speaks on the harsh conclusion of adolescence. The lyrics express longing for a return to childhood.

Opening with its drumbeat, the linear musical arrangement is structured around the phrase "my name's Blurryface and I care what you think." The track is built from wobbly synths, a Caribbean style keyboard line and rapped vocals by Tyler Joseph. The song is punctuated by brief bursts of string section and synths as well as eerie, theremin-like sounds that underscore his vocals. During its verses, Joseph recites deceptively simple lyrics atop the track's earworm beat. Joseph's rapping has him delivering confessional lines in a conversational tone. Following its refrain, the eerie melody precedes the second verse. The musical composition has downbeat atmosphere, with lyrical content focusing on personal themes.

=== Lyrics ===
Lyrically, "Stressed Out" follows a one-line rhyme scheme pattern and tells a story about the harsh end of adolescence, touching on Tyler Joseph's aging anxiety and his experience with making music. Tyler Joseph was in his mid-20s at the time of the single's release, performing a nostalgic "ode to the innocence of childhood" with lyrics speaking on the adolescent insecurity, transition from adolescence to adulthood, and millennial angst. He is speaking as a member of millennial generation "drowning in college loan debt" and sharing their anxieties while feigning apathy and yearning peer acceptance all over social media.

Throughout the track, Joseph personifies the parent album's titular character, "Blurryface", singing in the song's pre-chorus, "my name's Blurryface and I care what you think". He is a character within a story who represents Joseph's self-doubt and insecurities. Blurryface's insecurities lie in the idea of growing up and becoming an adult and the desire to return to "the good old days" and the tree houses of their carefree youth. His voice pines for a time prior to stress of reality, such as student loans and the pressure to get a job and find success. During the chorus, Joseph chants, "wish we could turn back time / to the good old days / when our mama sang us to sleep / but now we're stressed out." The song closes with an outro where external voices suggest the need to wake up because they need to make money.

"At the time I heard the song, I had no idea what Blurryface was, and I was kind of scratching my head going, 'Dude, uh, what's Blurryface?'"

— Mike Elizondo discussing the song's concept with Billboard

For a time, record producer Mike Elizondo was worried Joseph's specificity would limit the single's reception among the larger populace. In retrospect, Elizondo said: "We can all kind of relate to wanting to have more of those simpler days. I think he nailed it; though the lyrical content is very specific to him, the listener is able to impose their own story onto it. That type of feeling will never go away."

== Release and commercial performance ==
"Stressed Out" was first released as a promotional single through Fueled by Ramen on April 28, 2015, on the Google Play Store and Amazon. It was later added as the second track on Twenty One Pilots' fourth studio album Blurryface on May 17, 2015. The song was issued to contemporary hit radio stations as the album's fourth official single on November 10, 2015. "Stressed Out" became the first rock song to surpass a billion streams on Spotify.

"Stressed Out" debuted at number 87 on the US Billboard Hot 100 on the chart dated May 16, 2015. The song later rose from number 45 to number 28 on the chart dated December 17, 2015, giving Twenty One Pilots their first top 40 hit in the United States. Although it was released in 2015, "Stressed Out" did not truly take off and gradually find widespread breakthrough success until the following year. On the chart dated January 16, 2016, "Stressed Out" rose from number 13 to number nine, giving the group their first top-10 hit in the US. A month later, the song rose from number four and reached its peak of number two, being blocked from reaching number one by Canadian singer Justin Bieber's 2015 single "Love Yourself". At the time, Twenty One Pilots earned three top-10 hits: "Stressed Out", "Ride", and "Heathens", joining American electronic DJ and production duo The Chainsmokers as the only ones to have three or more top-10 hits on the Hot 100 in 2016. It ranked number five on the 2016 Hot 100 year-end list.

"Stressed Out" debuted at number one on the Billboard Hot Rock Songs chart, giving Twenty One Pilots their first number one hit on the chart. The song spent a record 23 weeks at number one on the Hot Rock Songs. It also peaked at number one on the Billboard airplay charts: Adult Top 40, Rock Airplay, Mainstream Top 40, and Alternative Airplay. In September 2023, for the 35th anniversary of the latter chart, Billboard ranked "Stressed Out" at number 85 on its list of the 100 most successful songs in the chart's history. On April 30, 2021, the single was certified 13× platinum by the Recording Industry Association of America (RIAA), denoting track-equivalent sales of 10,000,000 units in the US based on sales and streams. In March 2021, years after "Stressed Out" was released, it peaked at number 182 on the Billboard Global 200. The song peaked at number one in record charts of Russia and Mexico. It peaked within the top five in Australia, Austria, the Belgium Flanders chart, Canada, Czech Republic, Ecuador, France, Germany, Ireland, Israel, the Netherlands, New Zealand, Portugal, Slovakia, and Switzerland. According to the International Federation of the Phonographic Industry (IFPI), "Stressed Out" was the tenth best-performing single of 2016, with 9.9 million units combined sales and track-equivalent streams worldwide.

== Critical reception ==
Forbes called "Stressed Out" as an anthem for a millennial generation of a young man who has been discovering in mid 2010s that life as an adult is plagued with issues. Philip Cosores and the staff of Consequence mentioned the song "resonates with listeners, as the two sing about 'the good 'ol days' before the stress of reality set in". Writing for The Salt Lake Tribune, Sean P. Means felt that the song is "nostalgia-tinged". Andja Curcic of Renowned for Sound commented that it "places an importance on lyrics that look at the transition from adolescence to adulthood". In her review for The New York Times, Caryn Ganz considered the song an "anxiety anthem" and mentioned it is known for its "sing-songy chorus".

Jia Tolentino of The New Yorker stated the song's chorus is as "bright as its minor key will allow". Randy Holmes for ABC News Radio described the track as a "multi-genre breakout hit", while Madison Desler of the Orange County Register called it a "monster hit". Rachel Aroesti, writing for The Guardian, said "Stressed Out" is a "mode that is both evergreen and all the rage". Tampa Bay Times' Jay Cridlin lauded it as an "arena-shaking hit". The Oregonian reviewer Troy L. Smith felt that the song hit a "radio-friendly sweet spot". Molly Lambert of MTV wrote that the song "has a haunted, music-hall feeling, and a slightly embarrassing but highly effective earnestness in its longing for a romanticized, innocent past". She continued, saying it "genuinely stressed me out at first, with its herky-jerk from the verses into the chorus, but I eventually found myself constantly sing-saying 'My name's Blurryface and I care what you think' under my breath in all kinds of situations". The staff of Loudwire said that while they were listening to the song's lyrics, it was "not hard to see why the song has resonated with so many music fans". Critic Cole Waterman of Spectrum Culture called "Stressed Out" one of the album's best songs.

In mixed to negative reviews: The Sydney Morning Herald critic George Palathingal deemed the song as "catchy", and "essentially inoffensive". Chris Deville of Stereogum saw it as the "probably the most linear" song the group has made, and said it still manages to merge Sublime, Portishead, and ASAP Rocky. Slate's Carl Wilson criticized the song, stating the song's refrain is "menacingly flat and paranoiacally self-conscious in affect". Larry Fitzmaurice of Vulture opined the track is "arguably the most noxious quality of Twenty One Pilots' sound—front and center". Peter Sblendorio from New York Daily News considered the song to be a "radio staple".

Retrospectively, critics have considered "Stressed Out" one of Twenty One Pilots' best songs. Jason Pettigrew of Alternative Press called it a "diamond" and stated "Gen X boredom gives way to exasperated millennial neurosis" during the track. Bryony Symes from Louder Sound opined that "Stressed Out" is the group's best song to date and that the "kind of complex melody, with its slew of catchy hooks, that will get caught in a loop in your head, and have you humming along for hours after you've heard it". Writing for Cleveland.com, Anne Nickoloff and Troy Smith mentioned it was "going to be a hit right from the opening beat" and that it is as "pure of a rap-rock song the band has written, but its pop sensibility is clear. Even Tyler Joseph's self-deprecating lyrics couldn't slow its momentum". Variety's Chris Willman stated the "mortal concerns" of Twenty One Pilots' 2018 album Trench makes him feel "a little nostalgic" for some of the "in-your-face youth angst of 'Stressed Out'". Sam Law for Kerrang! deemed the track "a pop culture changing of the guard fading the disenfranchisement of Generation X into the neuroses of their millennial successors"; he opined it "feels judderingly relevant but also destined to live forever". In 2018, Louder Sound ranked the song number one on their list of the 10 greatest Twenty One Pilots songs, and in 2020, Kerrang ranked the song number three on their list of the 20 greatest Twenty One Pilots songs.

=== Accolades ===
"Stressed Out" was nominated for Top Rock Song at both the 2016 Billboard Music Awards and 2017 Billboard Music Awards. It was nominated for Choice Rock Song and Choice Song: Group at the 2016 Teen Choice Awards. The song won Alternative Rock Song of the Year at the 2016 iHeartRadio Music Awards, and was also nominated for Song of the Year at the 2017 iHeartRadio Music Awards. At the 59th Annual Grammy Awards, "Stressed Out" was nominated for Record of the Year and Best Pop Duo/Group Performance, winning the latter.

== Music video ==
=== Background and synopsis ===
By the time of Blurryface's release, Twenty One Pilots had been touring for a long time. When it was time to shoot a music video for "Stressed Out", the group had been feeling homesick from excessive touring. Their creative director, Mark Eshleman, arranged a time for the group to return to their hometown of Columbus, Ohio to shoot the video and finally be with their loved ones. Most of the video was shot at Josh Dun's childhood home, subsequently making it a destination for fans of the duo to visit. Dun said his parents have since had to cancel their landline telephone service in order to stop calls coming in at all hours.

Twenty One Pilots released the video for "Stressed Out" on April 27, 2015, and it was directed by Eshleman. The story begins on a partly cloudy day with Joseph pedalling down a street on a tricycle. Throughout the music video, black paint can be seen on his neck and hands. Joseph arrives at a house and enters a bedroom where Dun is waiting for him. The two perform the song within the mind of the young man who resembles the two save their tattoos and colored hair. At one point, the pair drink Capri Suns while sitting near a curb. The scene then changes to Joseph and Dun lying in beds as members from their combined families who are dressed in black watch them sleep and all chant "wake up, you need to make money" in unison.

The video depicts a bleak narrative set in a dreary suburban neighborhood, summoning a mixture of existential sequences and drawing visual cues from fairy tales such as Alice's Adventures in Wonderland. It follows a theme of the desire to forever remain a child instead of taking a journey into a disorienting environment as adults.

=== Reception ===
Writing for Diffuser, Michael Haskoor described it as a "perfectly paired visual", and said it is way more "minimalist than their video for the explosive "Tear in My Heart" and seems to fit well with the song's chorus". Courtney E. Smith of Radio.com compared the visual to Scottish novelist J. M. Barrie's 1904 play Peter Pan, or The Boy Who Wouldn't Grow Up, while Brenna Enrlich of MTV News compared it to the works of American rock band Blink-182 and stated the video is about "growing up and being an adult and whatnot. I think we can all relate to that". Cassie Whitt from Alternative Press opined it is a "sentiment any recent entrant into adulthood can relate". The video received a nomination for Best Music Video at the 2016 Alternative Press Music Awards. It was also nominated for Favorite Music Video at the 2017 Kids' Choice Awards.

== Promotion and live performances ==
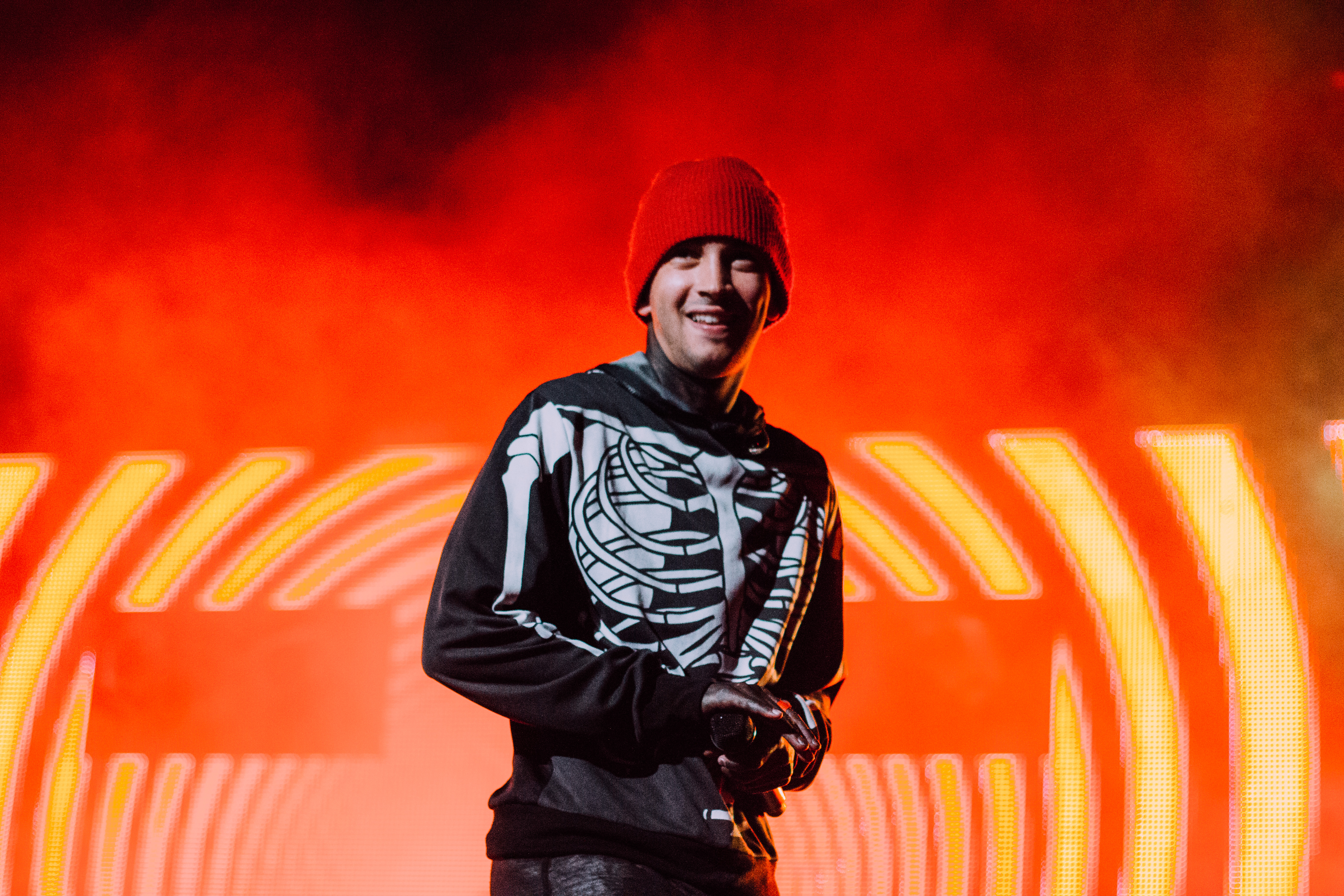
Tyler Joseph wearing black paint on his hands and neck, while performing in New Orleans on October 31, 2014

During the promotion of their forthcoming studio album, Joseph began wearing black paint in every video and live performance promoting Blurryface. Both the lyrics of "Stressed Out" as well as the paint reference the name and titular character of the album.

"Stressed Out" has since become a fan favorite at live concert venues. Twenty One Pilots performed "Stressed Out" on Late Night with Seth Meyers on September 21, 2015. Twenty One Pilots performed "Stressed Out" on their 2016 Emotional Roadshow World Tour in Ohio, with Joseph altering the lyrics of the first verse, which characterized the song as "overplayed, overstayed". Twenty One Pilots performed the song during a concert at the UNSW Roundhouse in Sydney, Australia on April 20, 2016.

== Personnel ==
Credits adapted from Blurryface liner notes.

- Tyler Joseph – lead vocals, programming, keyboards, songwriting
- Josh Dun – drums
- Mike Elizondo – upright bass, keyboards, programming
- Adam Hawkins – engineering
- Neal Avron – mixing engineer
- Scott Skrzynski – assistant mixing engineer
- Chris Gehringer – mastering engineer

== Charts ==
=== Weekly charts ===
2015–2016 weekly chart performance for "Stressed Out"
| Chart (2015–2016) | Peak position |
|---|---|
| Argentina (Monitor Latino) | 14 |
| Australia (ARIA) | 2 |
| Austria (Ö3 Austria Top 40) | 2 |
| Belgium (Ultratop 50 Flanders) | 3 |
| Belgium (Ultratop 50 Wallonia) | 7 |
| Canada Hot 100 (Billboard) | 3 |
| Canada AC (Billboard) | 29 |
| Canada CHR/Top 40 (Billboard) | 1 |
| Canada Hot AC (Billboard) | 4 |
| Canada Rock (Billboard) | 6 |
| CIS Airplay (TopHit) | 1 |
| Czech Republic Airplay (ČNS IFPI) | 2 |
| Czech Republic Singles Digital (ČNS IFPI) | 1 |
| Denmark (Tracklisten) | 10 |
| Ecuador (National-Report) | 4 |
| Finland (Suomen virallinen lista) | 7 |
| France (SNEP) | 2 |
| Germany (GfK) | 3 |
| Hungary (Rádiós Top 40) | 25 |
| Hungary (Single Top 40) | 11 |
| Hungary (Stream Top 40) | 10 |
| Ireland (IRMA) | 5 |
| Israel (Media Forest) | 2 |
| Italy (FIMI) | 7 |
| Mexico (Monitor Latino) | 1 |
| Mexico Ingles Airplay (Billboard) | 1 |
| Netherlands (Dutch Top 40) | 3 |
| Netherlands (Single Top 100) | 8 |
| New Zealand (Recorded Music NZ) | 5 |
| Norway (VG-lista) | 6 |
| Poland Airplay (ZPAV) | 1 |
| Portugal (AFP) | 5 |
| Russia Airplay (TopHit) | 2 |
| Scottish Singles Sales (Official Charts) | 8 |
| Slovakia Airplay (ČNS IFPI) | 5 |
| Slovakia Singles Digital (ČNS IFPI) | 7 |
| Slovenia (SloTop50) | 7 |
| Spain (Promusicae) | 17 |
| Sweden (Sverigetopplistan) | 9 |
| Switzerland (Schweizer Hitparade) | 2 |
| UK Singles (Official Charts) | 12 |
| Ukraine Airplay (Tophit) | 9 |
| US Billboard Hot 100 | 2 |
| US Adult Contemporary (Billboard) | 17 |
| US Adult Pop Airplay (Billboard) | 1 |
| US Dance Airplay (Billboard) | 4 |
| US Hot Rock & Alternative Songs (Billboard) | 1 |
| US Pop Airplay (Billboard) | 1 |
| US Rhythmic Airplay (Billboard) | 31 |
| US Rock & Alternative Airplay (Billboard) | 1 |

2021–2023 weekly chart performance for "Stressed Out"
| Chart (2021–2023) | Peak position |
|---|---|
| Global 200 (Billboard) | 141 |
| US Hot Rock & Alternative Songs (Billboard) | 16 |

=== Year-end charts ===
2015 year-end chart performance for "Stressed Out"
| Chart (2015) | Position |
|---|---|
| US Hot Rock Songs (Billboard) | 12 |
| US Rock Airplay (Billboard) | 45 |

2016 year-end chart performance for "Stressed Out"
| Chart (2016) | Position |
|---|---|
| Australia (ARIA) | 9 |
| Austria (Ö3 Austria Top 40) | 5 |
| Belgium (Ultratop Flanders) | 12 |
| Belgium (Ultratop Wallonia) | 23 |
| Brazil (Brasil Hot 100) | 36 |
| Canada (Canadian Hot 100) | 6 |
| CIS (Tophit) | 6 |
| Denmark (Tracklisten) | 37 |
| France (SNEP) | 6 |
| Germany (Official German Charts) | 8 |
| Hungary (Single Top 40) | 23 |
| Iceland (Plötutíóindi) | 28 |
| Israel (Media Forest) | 5 |
| Italy (FIMI) | 21 |
| Netherlands (Dutch Top 40) | 16 |
| Netherlands (Single Top 100) | 25 |
| New Zealand (Recorded Music NZ) | 11 |
| Poland (ZPAV) | 4 |
| Russia Airplay (Tophit) | 6 |
| Slovenia (SloTop50) | 31 |
| Spain (PROMUSICAE) | 34 |
| Sweden (Sverigetopplistan) | 21 |
| Switzerland (Schweizer Hitparade) | 4 |
| Ukraine Airplay (Tophit) | 15 |
| UK Singles (OCC) | 31 |
| US Billboard Hot 100 | 5 |
| US Adult Contemporary (Billboard) | 44 |
| US Adult Top 40 (Billboard) | 5 |
| US Dance/Mix Show Airplay (Billboard) | 32 |
| US Hot Rock Songs (Billboard) | 1 |
| US Mainstream Top 40 (Billboard) | 4 |
| US Rock Airplay (Billboard) | 7 |

2017 year-end chart performance for "Stressed Out"
| Chart (2017) | Position |
|---|---|
| Hungary (Rádiós Top 40) | 36 |

2024 year-end chart performance for "Stressed Out"
| Chart (2024) | Position |
|---|---|
| Hungary (Rádiós Top 40) | 59 |

=== Decade-end charts ===
Decade-end chart performance for "Stressed Out"
| Chart (2010–2019) | Position |
|---|---|
| US Hot Rock Songs (Billboard) | 10 |

== Certifications ==
Certifications for "Stressed Out"
| Region | Certification | Certified units/sales |
|---|---|---|
| Australia (ARIA) | 6× Platinum | 420,000^{‡} |
| Austria (IFPI Austria) | 5× Platinum | 150,000^{‡} |
| Belgium (BRMA) | 2× Platinum | 40,000^{‡} |
| Canada (Music Canada) | Diamond | 800,000^{‡} |
| Denmark (IFPI Danmark) | 3× Platinum | 270,000^{‡} |
| France (SNEP) | Diamond | 233,333^{‡} |
| Germany (BVMI) | Diamond | 1,000,000^{‡} |
| Italy (FIMI) | 5× Platinum | 250,000^{‡} |
| Mexico (AMPROFON) | Gold | 30,000^{*} |
| Netherlands (NVPI) | Diamond | 232,500^{‡} |
| New Zealand (RMNZ) | 7× Platinum | 210,000^{‡} |
| Norway (IFPI Norway) | 3× Platinum | 120,000^{‡} |
| Poland (ZPAV) | 2× Diamond | 200,000^{‡} |
| Portugal (AFP) | 4× Platinum | 80,000^{‡} |
| Spain (Promusicae) | 3× Platinum | 180,000^{‡} |
| Sweden (GLF) | 4× Platinum | 160,000^{‡} |
| Switzerland (IFPI Switzerland) | 2× Platinum | 60,000^{‡} |
| United Kingdom (BPI) | 4× Platinum | 2,400,000^{‡} |
| United States (RIAA) | 13× Platinum | 13,000,000^{‡} |
^{*} Sales figures based on certification alone.^{‡} Sales+streaming figures based on certification alone.

== Release history ==
Release history and formats for "Stressed Out"
| Region | Date | Format | Label | Ref. |
|---|---|---|---|---|
| Various | April 28, 2015 | Digital download (promotional single); stream | Fueled by Ramen | |
| United States | November 10, 2015 | Contemporary hit radio | Fueled by Ramen; RRP | |

== See also ==
- List of best-selling singles in the United States
- List of Hot Rock & Alternative Songs number ones
- List of Billboard Mainstream Top 40 number-one songs of 2016
- List of most-streamed songs on Spotify
