= Josh Dun =

American musician

- Dun performing with Twenty One Pilots in 2026

Background information
- Born: Joshua William Dun; June 18, 1988 (age 38); Columbus, Ohio, U.S.
- Genres: Alternative hip-hop; indie pop; alternative rock; electropop; pop rock
- Occupation: Musician
- Instruments: Drums; percussion; trumpet
- Years active: 2010–present
- Member of: Twenty One Pilots
- Spouse: Debby Ryan (m. 2019)
- Children: 1

Joshua William Dun (born June 18, 1988) is an American musician. He is best known as the drummer of the musical duo Twenty One Pilots, alongside Tyler Joseph. As part of Twenty One Pilots, he has been nominated for six Grammy Awards, of which he has won one.

== Early life ==
Joshua William Dun was born in Columbus, Ohio, on June 18, 1988, the son of hospice social worker Laura Lee Dun (née McCollum) and physical therapy assistant William Earl "Bill" Dun. He has two sisters and a brother. His great-great-great-grandparents were the American rancher Edwin Dun, who was the United States Ambassador to Japan, and his second Japanese wife, Yama.

He initially took trumpet lessons at school and then turned his attention to drums, teaching himself how to play. One method Dun references was imitating the beats of the records he would buy on an electronic drum kit.

He worked at Guitar Center for three years, where he met former Twenty One Pilots drummer Chris Salih, who eventually introduced him to his future bandmate Tyler Joseph.

== Career ==
=== 2010: House of Heroes ===
In March 2010, Dun joined House of Heroes as a touring member after the band's drummer, Colin Rigsby, took a break to spend more time with his family. He makes an appearance in the music video for the band's single "God Save the Foolish Kings." He performed on House of Heroes' live tour until October, when Rigsby returned to his duties.

After quitting his job at Guitar Center, Dun planned to leave for Nashville, Tennessee in pursuit of a drum career in the industry; however, he was stopped by Twenty One Pilots drummer Chris Salih, who offered him his role. He went on to play a show with Tyler Joseph, after Salih and bassist Nick Thomas left the group due to other commitments. They played one song before police officers showed up and cancelled the show. Dun subsequently became the band's full-time drummer, joining as production on the band's second studio album Regional at Best drew to a close. The album was released on July 8, 2011, shortly after Dun's recruitment. Although he does not perform on the album, he is credited in the liner notes.

=== 2011–present: Twenty One Pilots ===
In April 2012, Twenty One Pilots signed with record label Fueled by Ramen, a subsidiary of Atlantic Records. Twenty One Pilots' third studio album, Vessel, was released on January 8, 2013, through Fueled by Ramen and reached no. 21 on the Billboard 200.

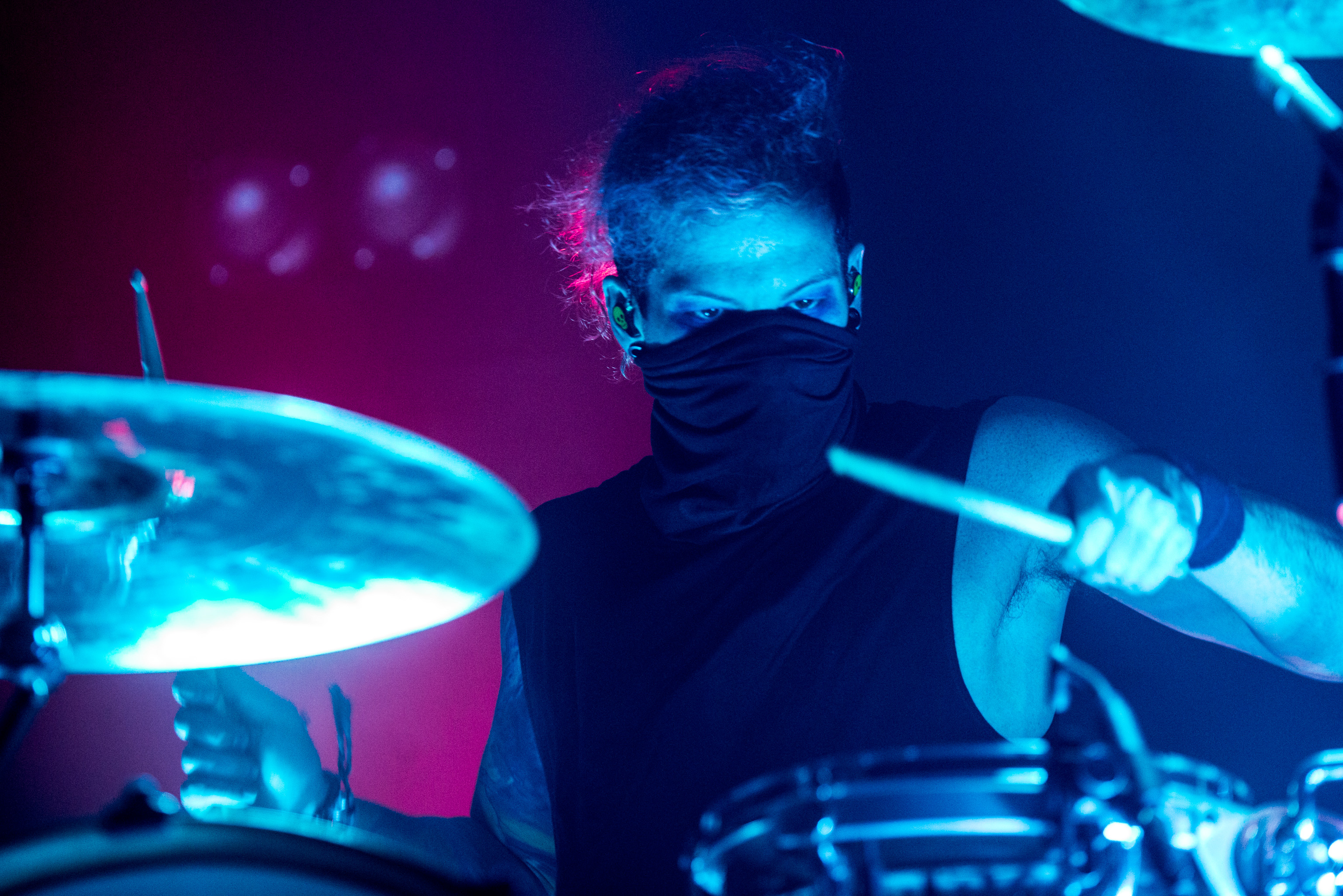
Dun performing in Munich, Germany in 2016

The band's fourth studio album, Blurryface, was released on May 17, 2015, two days ahead of its intended release date. At this point in Twenty One Pilots' career, the band had topped the charts with their hit single "Stressed Out"–the song's music video being filmed at Dun's childhood home—and has since received over 3 billion views on YouTube.

Their fifth studio album, Trench, was released on October 5, 2018. The album was the first release of the newly revived Elektra Music Group.

On April 9, 2020, the duo released a new single "Level of Concern". The accompanying music video for the track was filmed in both Joseph and Dun's respective homes while they were under lockdown due to the U.S. state and local government responses to the COVID-19 pandemic. On December 8, 2020, Twenty One Pilots released a Christmas song, titled "Christmas Saves the Year", during a Twitch livestream hosted by Tyler Joseph. The duo's sixth studio album, Scaled and Icy, was released on May 21, 2021.

The duo's seventh studio album, Clancy, was initially set for release on May 17, 2024, exactly nine years to the release of Blurryface, but was delayed by a week while Dun, Joseph and videographer Mark Eshleman completed music videos for each song. The lead single, "Overcompensate", was released on February 29. In Dun's directorial debut, he directed the music video for the third single, "Backslide", which was released on April 25.

Their eighth studio album, Breach, was released on September 12, 2025, and concluded the conceptual series that began with Blurryface. In "Drum Show", which was released as a single on August 18, Dun contributed his first lead vocals to a song.

=== Other ventures ===
In 2017, Dun partnered with Hayley Williams of pop punk band Paramore to promote her hair dye line "Good Dye Young" as a brand ambassador. In 2025, Dun created his own YouTube channel, where he has uploaded drum covers of songs from bands such as Rage Against the Machine, Lagwagon and Turnstile.

== Influences ==
At the age of 13, Dun developed an interest in punk music, initially seeking "the fastest punk rock that he could find." He mainly listened to punk rock when he was growing up. He cites ...And Out Come the Wolves by Rancid as an early influence due to its combination of different music genres. Some of his earliest purchases were an album by NOFX, and Human Clay by Creed, citing "Higher" as one of his favorite songs. Afterward, he branched into pop punk music, citing Does This Look Infected? by Sum 41, as well as Blink-182. When learning drums, Dun would play along to Metallica. However, his parents set strict rules on what music he could listen to, about which he later said, "I'd hide albums like Green Day's Dookie underneath my bed. Sometimes they'd find them and get real mad. They'd find a Christian alternative, like Relient K, and make me listen to that." Later, Dun transitioned to slower alternative rock, with albums like Daisy by Brand New.

He initially took trumpet lessons at school and then turned his attention to drums, teaching himself how to play. One method Dun references was imitating the beats of the records he'd buy on an electronic drum kit. Since a young age, Dun has ultimately sought to "blend" genres and make diverse music.

== Personal life ==
Dun and Twenty One Pilots bandmate Tyler Joseph both have an "X" tattoo on their bodies symbolizing their dedication to their hometown fans in Columbus, Ohio. They received it onstage during their hometown show at the Lifestyle Communities Pavilion on April 26, 2013. Joseph's is placed on his right bicep, and Dun's is located on his neck just behind his right ear. Dun also sports the name "Tyler" above his left knee, which he received from Joseph onstage during a show at the Eagles Ballroom in Milwaukee, Wisconsin on October 30, 2015. They are both fans of the Ohio State Buckeyes. Dun's favorite film is Fight Club (1999).

Dun dated actress and singer Debby Ryan from May 2013 to September 2014. They resumed their relationship sometime after. They were married in Austin, Texas, on December 31, 2019. The two are longtime fans of the Fast & Furious franchise and went on to make a cameo appearance in Fast X.

Dun and Ryan currently live in Columbus, Ohio. In March 2023, magazine Architectural Digest released a documentary about their home. The pair commissioned Dun's brother's girlfriend to sculpt a bust of Dwayne Johnson. Being an avid boxer, Dun also assembled a boxing ring in his basement. In May 2023, instrument retailer Sweetwater filmed a documentary about the construction of Dun's home studio. The studio was designed by Haverstick Designs, the same firm that designed bandmate Tyler Joseph's home studio.

Dun has proclaimed that he is a supporter of the Black Lives Matter movement.

On September 7, 2025, Dun and Ryan announced that they are expecting their first child. On December 13, 2025, the pair announced the birth of their daughter.

== Discography ==
=== Studio albums ===
==== with Twenty One Pilots ====
- Regional at Best (2011)
- Vessel (2013)
- Blurryface (2015)
- Trench (2018)
- Scaled and Icy (2021)
- Clancy (2024)
- Breach (2025)

=== with other artists ===
List of songs Josh Dun is featured in
Year	Song	Album	Artist	Role	Notes
2016	"Midnight Heart"	x Infinity	George Watsky	Drums, music video cameo	
2017	"Savage" "Almost Had Me"	Skin and Earth	Lights	Drums	
2017	"Orthodontist Girl"	The Knife	Goldfinger	Drums	
2018	"Fake It" "Take Me With You"	Ghosts of Youth	Wingtip	Writer/composer, publisher	
2019	"PREY FOR ME/3"	Strength in Numb333rs	Fever 333	Writer/composer, publisher	
2019	"Invisible Hearts" "Broken Places"	State of Mind (Deluxe)	The Faim	Writer/composer, publisher	
2020	"Dark Times"	I'd Rather Die Than Let You In	The Hunna	Drums, writer/composer,	
2020	"Happy Face"	33	Jagwar Twin	Drums, trumpet	The song was released on December 21, 2020.
2020	"The MegaMix Drum Cover"		Josh Dun, Matt McGuire	Drums	
2022	"In My Head"	Pep	Lights	Drums	The song was released in March.
2023	"Great Time to Be Human"	TBA	Jagwar Twin	Writer/composer, publisher	
2023	"Life is Good"		angelbaby, Jagwar Twin	Writer/composer	
2023	"Good Time (1:08)"		Jagwar Twin	Writer/composer, publisher	

== Filmography ==
Year	Title	Role	Ref.
2013	This is Wavorly.	Jaime	Web-series by Mississippi rock band Wavorly. Episode 2: "Jaime is Dun"
2022	Twenty One Pilots: Cinema Experience	Himself	
2023	Fast X	Himself	Cameo
2026	Twenty One Pilots: More Than We Ever Imagined	Himself	

== Awards and nominations ==
Year	Ceremony	Award	Nominated	Result	Ref.
2014	Alternative Press Music Awards	Best Drummer	Josh Dun	Nominated	
2025	Drumeo Awards	Rock Drummer of the Year	Josh Dun	Won	

== See also ==
- Tyler Joseph
- List of songs recorded by Twenty One Pilots
