= MTV Europe Music Award for Best Metaverse Performance =

Music video award

- Awarded for: Virtual concerts
- Country: Europe
- Presented by: MTV
- First award: 2022
- Currently held by: Blackpink
- Website: ema.mtv.tv

The MTV Europe Music Award for Best Metaverse Performance award was first introduced at the MTV Europe Music Awards in 2022.

== Winners ==
Winners are listed first and highlighted in bold.

† indicates an MTV Video Music Award for Best Metaverse Performance–winning artist that same year.
‡ indicates an MTV Video Music Award for Best Metaverse Performance–nominated artist that same year.

=== 2020s ===
Year	Nominees	Ref.
2022	**Blackpink: The Virtual (PUBG) †**	
2022	BTS (Minecraft) ‡	
2022	Charli XCX (Roblox) ‡	
2022	Justin Bieber – An Interactive Virtual Experience (Wave) ‡	
2022	Twenty One Pilots Concert Experience (Roblox) ‡	

== See also ==
- MTV Video Music Award for Best Metaverse Performance
