= List of Dutch artists nominated for MTV Europe Music Awards =

The following is a list of Dutch artists nominated for MTV Europe Music Awards. List does not include MTV Europe Music Award for Best Dutch Act, MTV Europe Music Award for Best Dutch & Belgian Act, New Sounds of Europe or MTV Europe Music Award for Best European Act.

| Year | Nomination | Artist | Ref |
|---|---|---|---|
| 1994 | Best Dance | 2 Unlimited | |
| 1999 | Best Breakthrough Act | Vengaboys | |
| 2013 | Best Electronic | Afrojack | |
| 2014 | Best Electronic | Afrojack | |
| 2014 | Best Electronic | Hardwell | |
| 2015 | Best Electronic | Martin Garrix | |
| 2015 | Best Push Act | Natalie La Rose | |
| 2016 | Best Electronic | Martin Garrix | |
| 2016 | Best Electronic | Afrojack | |
| 2017 | Best Electronic | Martin Garrix | |
| 2018 | Best Electronic | Martin Garrix | |
| 2019 | Best Electronic | Martin Garrix | |
| 2020 | Best Electronic | Martin Garrix | |
| 2022 | Best Electronic | Tiësto | |
| 2023 | Best Electronic | Tiësto | |
