= List of Swedish artists nominated for MTV Europe Music Awards =

The following is a list of Swedish artists nominated for MTV Europe Music Awards. List does not include MTV Europe Music Award for Best Swedish Act, New Sounds of Europe, MTV Europe Music Award for Best Nordic Act or MTV Europe Music Award for Best European Act. Winners are in bold text.

Year	Nomination	Artist	Ref
1994	Best Song	Neneh Cherry	
1994	Best Female	Neneh Cherry	
1994	Best Cover	Ace of Base	
1994	Best Breakthrough Act	Whale	
1994	Best Video	Whale	
1996	Best Female	Neneh Cherry	
1996	Best Breakthrough Act	The Cardigans	
1997	Best Song	The Cardigans	
1998	Best Male	Eagle Eye Cherry	
1998	Best Video	Eagle Eye Cherry	
1999	Best Rock	The Cardigans	
1999	Best Group	The Cardigans	
2004	Best Alternative	The Hives	
2012	Best Electronic	Swedish House Mafia	
2012	Best Electronic	Avicii	
2013	Best Push Act	Icona Pop	
2013	Best New Act	Icona Pop	
2013	**Best Electronic**	Avicii	
2014	Best Electronic	Avicii	
2015	Best Electronic	Avicii	
2015	Best Push Act	Zara Larsson	
2016	**Best New Act**	Zara Larsson	
