= List of Scottish artists nominated for MTV Europe Music Awards =

The following is a list of Scottish artists nominated for MTV Europe Music Awards. List does not include MTV Europe Music Award for Best UK & Ireland Act, New Sounds of Europe or MTV Europe Music Award for Best European Act. Winners are in bold text.

Year	Nomination	Artist	Ref
1994	**Best Cover**	Gun	
1994	Best Cover	Wet Wet Wet	
2000	Best Group	Travis	
2001	Best Album	Travis	
2002	Best Video	Primal Scream	
2004	Best New Act	Franz Ferdinand	
2004	Best Alternative	Franz Ferdinand	
2005	Best Rock	Franz Ferdinand	
**2012**	Best Video	Calvin Harris	
**2012**	Best Song	Calvin Harris	
**2012**	Best Electronic	Calvin Harris	
**2012**	Best World Stage Performance	Snow Patrol	
2013	Best Electronic	Calvin Harris	
2013	Best Alternative	Franz Ferdinand	
2014	**Best Electronic**	Calvin Harris	
2015	Best Electronic	Calvin Harris	
2016	Best Electronic	Calvin Harris	
2017	Best Electronic	Calvin Harris	
2018	Best Electronic	Calvin Harris	
2019	Best Electronic	Calvin Harris	
2019	Best Push Act	Lewis Capaldi	
2019	Best Electronic	Calvin Harris	
2020	Best Electronic	Calvin Harris	
