= List of French artists nominated for MTV Europe Music Awards =

The following is a list of French artists nominated for MTV Europe Music Awards. List does not include MTV Europe Music Award for Best French Act, New Sounds of Europe or MTV Europe Music Award for Best European Act. Winners are in bold text.

| Year | Nomination | Artist | Ref |
|---|---|---|---|
| 1994 | Best Male | MC Solaar | |
| 1994 | Best Video | MC Solaar | |
| 1997 | Best Video | Daft Punk | |
| 1997 | Best Dance | Daft Punk | |
| 1999 | Best Dance | Mr. Oizo | |
| 2001 | Best Dance | Daft Punk | |
| 2001 | Web Award | Daft Punk | |
| 2006 | **Best Video** | Justice | |
| 2007 | **Best Video** | Justice | |
| 2009 | Best Song | David Guetta | |
| 2011 | Best Video | Justice | |
| 2011 | Best Male | David Guetta | |
| 2012 | **Best Electronic** | David Guetta | |
| 2013 | Best Song | Daft Punk | |
| 2013 | Best Electronic | Daft Punk | |
| 2014 | Best Electronic | David Guetta | |
| 2015 | Best Electronic | David Guetta | |
| 2016 | Best Electronic | David Guetta | |
| 2016 | **Best Video** | Daft Punk | |
| 2017 | **Best Electronic** | David Guetta | |
| 2017 | Best Push Act | Petite Meller | |
| 2018 | Best Electronic | David Guetta | |
| 2019 | Best Electronic | DJ Snake | |
| 2020 | Best Electronic | David Guetta | |
| 2020 | Video for Good | David Guetta | |
