= Blackpink House =

South Korean variety show by Blackpink

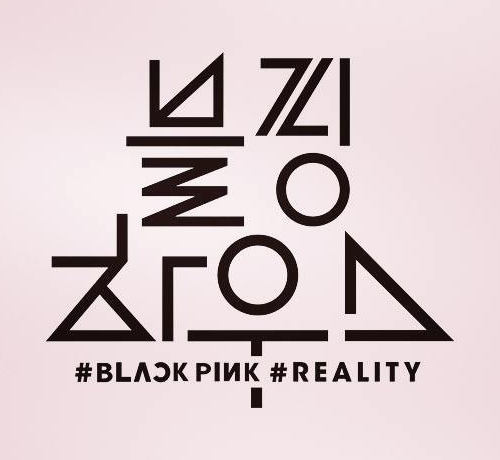
- Hangul: 블핑하우스
- RR: Beulping hauseu
- MR: Pŭlp'ing hausŭ
- Genre: Variety show
- Starring: Kim Ji-soo; Jennie Kim; Roseanne Park; Lalisa Manoban
- Opening theme: "As If It's Your Last"
- Country of origin: South Korea
- Original language: Korean
- No. of seasons: 1
- No. of episodes: 12

Original release
- Network: V Live
- Release: January 6 – August 17, 2018

Blackpink House (Korean: 블핑하우스; RR: Beulping hauseu) is a South Korean reality show by Blackpink broadcast by the South Korean television station JTBC. The show is about the members of Blackpink and what they do during their hiatus and everyday lives. The first episode of the show was aired on JTBC2 Channel on January 6, 2018. The show was also aired online via YouTube and via Naver's V Live. It can also be watched on Amazon Prime Video.

== History ==
Blackpink's agency, YG Entertainment, has a history of releasing variety shows to showcase its artists. This list includes variety shows for BigBang, 2NE1, and Winner.

In 2016, Blackpink House first appeared on Naver TV on August 25, after a test of the program concluded on August 21. Following that release, YG Entertainment officially announced Blackpink House to be a program that would allow viewers insight into the members' daily lives, appearances, and interactions. However, there was no other news about the program until November 2017, when YG posted the message «Blackpink TV.»

In December 2017, YG Entertainment released a teaser video on Blackpink's YouTube account. In the teaser, the members of Blackpink were fooled by a candid camera prank by YG founder Yang Hyun Suk.

When the members were stating their wishes such as a summer vacation, Yang Hyun Suk revealed himself to them with a 1-year anniversary cake, surprising the group. Yang Hyun Suk proposed a new show to them, "Blackpink TV", as a response to the members' desire for a vacation to relieve the stresses of their jobs. Additionally, he also stated that as part of the show, a pink-themed house representing Blackpink would be constructed for them to live in during their one hundred days of vacation filming the show.

As of June 2020, episodes of Blackpink House collectively have more than 400 million views on YouTube.

== Episodes ==
Season	Episodes	Originally aired	
Season	Episodes	First aired	Last aired
1	12	January 6, 2018	August 17, 2018
