= 2022 MTV Europe Music Awards =

Music award ceremony held in Germany

- Date: 13 November 2022
- Location: PSD Bank Dome, Düsseldorf, Germany
- Hosted by: Rita Ora; Taika Waititi
- Most wins: Taylor Swift (4)
- Most nominations: Harry Styles (7)
- Website: mtvema.com

Television/radio coverage
- Network: Paramount International Networks; MTV (International); Pluto TV
- Produced by: Bruce Gilmer; Richard Godfrey; Debbie Phillips; Chloe Mason

The 2022 MTV Europe Music Awards were held on 13 November 2022 at the PSD Bank Dome in Düsseldorf, Germany. This marks the sixth time the award show is hosted in Germany. The show aired live on MTV with an hour long pre-show leading up to the main show. New Zealand filmmaker Taika Waititi hosted the ceremony with British singer Rita Ora, marking Ora's second time as a host.

Taylor Swift won the most awards during the ceremony, winning four. Harry Styles led the nominations with seven, making him the most nominated artist, followed by Swift with six, making her the most nominated female artist.

== Performances ==
The performers were announced on November 8, 2022.

List of musical performances
Artist(s)	Song(s)
Pre-show
Armani White	"Goated" "Billie Eilish"
Main show
David Guetta; Bebe Rexha	"I'm Good (Blue)"
Muse	"Will of the People"
Ava Max	"Million Dollar Baby"
Gorillaz; Thundercat	"Cracker Island" (filmed at Tonhalle Düsseldorf)
Stormzy; Debbie	"Firebabe"
OneRepublic	"I Ain't Worried"
Gayle	"ABCDEFU"
Lewis Capaldi	"Forget Me"
Tate McRae	"She's All I Wanna Be" "Uh Oh"
Kalush Orchestra	"Stefania"
Spinall; Äyanna; Nasty C	"Power (Remember Who You Are)"

== Presenters ==
The presenters were announced on November 8, 2022.

- Becca Dudley and Jack Saunders – pre-show hosts
- Rita Ora and Taika Waititi – main show hosts; announced the winner of Best Pop and Best Song
- Julian Lennon – presented Best Longform Video
- Leomie Anderson and Leonie Hanne – presented Best Rock
- Pos – presented Best New
- Lauren Spencer-Smith and Sam Ryder – presented Best Collaboration
- David Hasselhoff – presented Best Artist
- Luis Gerardo Méndez and Miguel Ángel Silvestre – presented Best Latin

== Winners and nominations ==
Nominations were announced on 12 October 2022. Two new categories were introduced: Best Longform Video and Best Metaverse Performance. The awards for Best R&B and Best Live were reintroduced for this show.

Winners are listed first and are bolded.

Best Song	Best Video
**Nicki Minaj — "Super Freaky Girl"**; Bad Bunny and Chencho Corleone — "Me Porto Bonito"; Harry Styles — "As It Was"; Jack Harlow — "First Class"; Lizzo – "About Damn Time"; Rosalía – "Despechá"	**Taylor Swift – All Too Well: The Short Film**; Blackpink — "Pink Venom"; Doja Cat — "Woman"; Harry Styles — "As It Was"; Kendrick Lamar – "The Heart Part 5"; Nicki Minaj — "Super Freaky Girl"
Best Collaboration	Best Artist
**David Guetta and Bebe Rexha — "I'm Good (Blue)"**; Bad Bunny and Chencho Corleone — "Me Porto Bonito"; DJ Khaled feat. Drake and Lil Baby – "Staying Alive"; Megan Thee Stallion and Dua Lipa — "Sweetest Pie"; Post Malone feat. Doja Cat — "I Like You (A Happier Song)"; Shakira and Rauw Alejandro – "Te Felicito"; Tiësto and Ava Max – "The Motto"	**Taylor Swift**; Adele; Beyoncé; Harry Styles; Nicki Minaj; Rosalía
Best R&B	Best New
**Chlöe**; H.E.R.; Khalid; Giveon; Summer Walker; SZA	**Seventeen**; Baby Keem; Dove Cameron; GAYLE; Stephen Sanchez; Tems
Best Pop	Best Electronic
**Taylor Swift**; Billie Eilish; Doja Cat; Ed Sheeran; Harry Styles; Lizzo	**David Guetta**; Calvin Harris; DJ Snake; Marshmello; Swedish House Mafia; Tiësto
Best Rock	Best Alternative
**Muse**; Foo Fighters; Måneskin; Red Hot Chili Peppers; Liam Gallagher; The Killers	**Gorillaz**; Imagine Dragons; Panic! At The Disco; Tame Impala; Twenty One Pilots; Yungblud
Best Hip-Hop	Best Latin
**Nicki Minaj**; Drake; Future; Jack Harlow; Kendrick Lamar; Lil Baby; Megan Thee Stallion	**Anitta**; Bad Bunny; Becky G; J Balvin; Rosalía; Shakira
Best K-Pop	Best Live
**Lisa**; Blackpink; BTS; Itzy; Seventeen; Twice	**Harry Styles**; Coldplay; Ed Sheeran; Kendrick Lamar; Lady Gaga; The Weeknd
Best Push	Best Longform Video
**Seventeen**; Nessa Barrett; Mae Muller; GAYLE; Shenseea; Omar Apollo; Wet Leg; Muni Long; Doechii; Saucy Santana; Stephen Sanchez; JVKE	**Taylor Swift – All Too Well: The Short Film**; Foo Fighters — Studio 666; Taylor Hawkins Tribute Concert: Wembley Stadium, London; Rosalía — "MOTOMAMI (ROSALÍA TikTok LIVE Performance)"; Stormzy – "Mel Made Me Do It"
Best Metaverse Performance	Video for Good
**Blackpink – "Blackpink x PUBG 2022 In-Game Concert: The Virtual"**; BTS – "'Butter' & 'Permission To Dance' Minecraft Concert!"; Charli XCX – "Samsung Superstar Galaxy Concert Charli XCX – Roblox"; Justin Bieber – "Wave Presents: Justin Bieber – An Interactive Virtual Experience"; Twenty One Pilots – "Roblox presents Twenty One Pilots Concert Experience"	**Sam Smith feat. Kim Petras – "Unholy"**; Ed Sheeran feat Lil Baby – "2step"; Kendrick Lamar — "The Heart Part 5"; Latto — "Pussy"; Lizzo — "About Damn Time"; Stromae – "Fils de joie"
Biggest Fans	Generation Award
**BTS**; Taylor Swift; Nicki Minaj; Blackpink; Harry Styles; Lady Gaga	**Lina Deshvar**; **Anna Kutova**; **Anfisa Yankovina**
Best Look 'Personal Style'
**Rita Ora**

=== Regional awards ===
Europe
Best Dutch Act	Best French Act
**Goldband**; Antoon; Frenna; Rondé; Yade Lauren	**Amir**; Aya Nakamura; Orelsan; Soolking; Tayc
Best German Act	Best Hungarian Act
**Badmómzjay**; Giant Rooks; Nina Chuba; Leony; Kontra K	**Carson Coma**; Beton.Hofi; Дeva; Elefánt; Krúbi
Best Israeli Act	Best Italian Act
**Noa Kirel**; Anna Zak; Mergui; Nunu; Shahar Saul	**Pinguini Tattici Nucleari**; Blanco; Elodie; Måneskin; Ariete
Best Nordic Act	Best Polish Act
**Sigrid (Norway)**; Kygo (Norway); MØ (Denmark); Swedish House Mafia (Sweden); Tove Lo (Sweden)	**Ralph Kaminski**; Julia Wieniawa; Margaret; Mata; Young Leosia
Best Portuguese Act	Best Spanish Act
**Bárbara Bandeira**; Ivandro; Julinho KSD; Syro; T-Rex	**Bad Gyal**; Dani Fernández; Fito & Fitipaldis; Quevedo; Rosalía
Best Swiss Act	Best UK & Ireland Act
**Loredana**; Patent Ochsner; Marius Bear; Faber; Priya Ragu	**Harry Styles**; Adele; Cat Burns; Dave; Lewis Capaldi
Africa
Best African Act
**Burna Boy (Nigeria)**; Ayra Starr (Nigeria); Black Sherif (Ghana); Musa Keys (South Africa); Tems (Nigeria); Zuchu (Tanzania)
Asia
Best Indian Act
**Armaan Malik**; Badshah; Zephyrtone; Gurbax; Raja Kumari
Best Asia Act
**Tomorrow X Together (Korea)**; Niki (Indonesia); Maymay Entrata (Philippines); SILVY (Thailand); The Rampage from Exile Tribe (Japan)
Australia and New Zealand
Best Australian Act	Best New Zealand Act
**G Flip**; Genesis Owusu; Ruel; The Kid Laroi; Vance Joy	**Lorde**; Benee; Coterie; L.A.B.; Shouse
Americas
Best Brazilian Act	Best Canadian Act
**Manu Gavassi**; Anitta; Gloria Groove; L7NNON; Xamã	**Johnny Orlando**; Avril Lavigne; Drake; Tate McRae; The Weeknd
Best Caribbean Act	Best Latin America North Act
**Daddy Yankee**; Bad Bunny; Natti Natasha; Myke Towers; Rauw Alejandro	**Kenia Os**; Danna Paola; Kevin Kaarl; Santa Fe Klan; Natanael Cano
Best Latin America Central Act	Best Latin America South Act
**Danny Ocean**; Karol G; Feid; Manuel Turizo; Camilo	**Tini**; Bizarrap; Duki; María Becerra; Tiago PZK
Best US Act
**Billie Eilish**; Doja Cat; Jack Harlow; Lil Nas X; Lizzo; Taylor Swift
