= Blackpink: The Virtual =

2022 virtual concert

- Virtual concert by Blackpink
- Start date: July 22, 2022
- End date: July 31, 2022

Blackpink concert chronology
- YG Palm Stage ― 2021 Blackpink: The Show (2021); Blackpink: The Virtual (2022); Born Pink World Tour (2022–23)

Blackpink: The Virtual was a virtual concert by South Korean girl group Blackpink in the battle royale video game PUBG Mobile. The concert ran for two weekends, on July 22-23 and July 29-30, 2022 in North and South America, and on July 23-24 and July 30-31 in all other countries. It featured performances of several of the group's songs as well as the exclusive debut of a special track entitled "Ready for Love" from their second studio album Born Pink (2022).

== Background and release ==
South Korean girl group Blackpink first collaborated with PUBG Mobile to celebrate the launch of their debut studio album The Album in 2020. On July 12, 2022, YG Entertainment revealed that the group was once again collaborating with the gaming company to hold a virtual in-game concert in PUBG Mobile called "Blackpink: The Virtual" from July 22 to 31. The concert included performances of the group's hit songs as well as a special track to be revealed during the event for the first time, marking the group's first new music release in nearly two years since The Album. The concert would run over two weekends, between July 22 and 23 and then again between July 29 and 30 in North and South America. For all other countries, it would take place between July 23 and 24, and then again from July 30 to 31. Free in-game concert tickets were available on the PUBG Mobile app after July 15, on which a “concert resource pack” was also released in the game. Tencent Games also announced that PUBG Mobile players could obtain the outfits worn by the band during the concert from July 23 to August 31. The concert premiered in the game on July 22, including a performance of Blackpink's special track "Ready for Love". The track was released in full on July 29 as an animated music video on YouTube featuring virtual avatars of the group in the game world.

== Set list ==
1. "Ddu-Du Ddu-Du"
2. "Kill This Love"
3. "How You Like That"
4. "Ready for Love"

== Reception ==
"Blackpink: The Virtual" was attended by 15.7 million viewers during the two weekends it ran on the PUBG Mobile app. The music video for "Ready for Love" reached 43.7 million views in the first week and has since surpassed 150 million views.

== Accolades ==
"Blackpink: The Virtual" won the award for Best Metaverse Performance at the 2022 MTV Video Music Awards and the 2022 MTV Europe Music Awards, becoming the group's second and first time winning respectively at the award shows. Blackpink also won a Guinness World Record for being the inaugural winner of the category at the MTV Video Music Awards.

Awards and nominations for "Blackpink: The Virtual"
| Year | Organization | Award | Result | Ref. |
|---|---|---|---|---|
| 2022 | MTV Video Music Awards | Best Metaverse Performance | Won | |
| 2022 | MTV Europe Music Awards | Best Metaverse Performance | Won | |

World records for "Blackpink: The Virtual"
| Year | Organization | Award | Ref. |
|---|---|---|---|
| 2022 | Guinness World Records | First winner of Best Metaverse Performance at the MTV Video Music Awards | |
