= MTV Video Music Award for Best Metaverse Performance =

Music video award

- Awarded for: Virtual concerts
- Country: United States
- Presented by: MTV
- First award: 2022
- Currently held by: Blackpink
- Website: VMA website

The MTV Video Music Award for Best Metaverse Performance award was first introduced at the MTV Video Music Awards in 2022.

== Recipients ==
=== 2020s ===
Recipients
Year (Note: Each year is linked to the article about the MTV Video Music Awards held that year.)	Winner(s)	Performance	Nominees	Ref.
2022	Blackpink	Blackpink: The Virtual (PUBG)	BTS (Minecraft); Charli XCX (Roblox); Justin Bieber – An Interactive Virtual Experience (Wave); Rift Tour (featuring Ariana Grande) (Fortnite); Twenty One Pilots Concert Experience (Roblox)	
