= MTV Europe Music Award for Best Cover =

Music award given out in Europe

The following is a list of the MTV Europe Music Award winners and nominees for Best Cover.

== 1990s ==
Year	Winner	Nominees	Ref
1994	Gun — "Word Up!"	Ace of Base — "Don't Turn Around"; Big Mountain — "Baby, I Love Your Way"; Pet Shop Boys — "Go West"; Wet Wet Wet — "Love Is All Around"	
