= Blackpink =

South Korean girl group

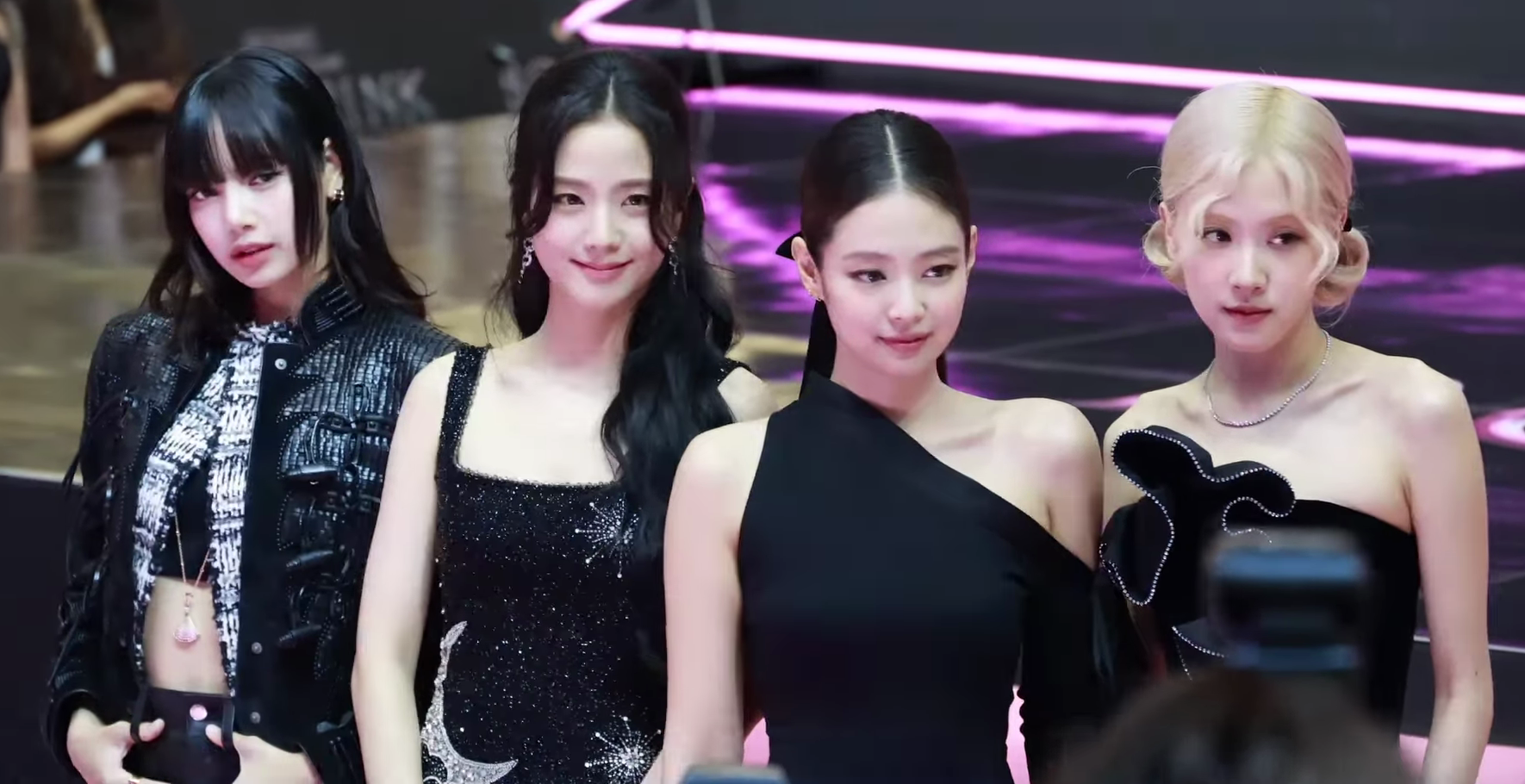
- Blackpink in 2024; From left to right: Lisa, Jisoo, Jennie, and Rosé

Background information
- Origin: Seoul, South Korea
- Genres: K-pop; EDM; hip-hop; trap
- Works: Discography; songs
- Years active: 2016–present
- Labels: YG; YGEX; Interscope; Universal; Polydor
- Members: Jisoo; Jennie; Rosé; Lisa
- Website: blackpinkofficial.com

Blackpink (Korean: 블랙핑크; stylized in all caps) is a South Korean girl group formed by YG Entertainment. The group is composed of four members: Jisoo, Jennie, Rosé, and Lisa. Regarded by various publications as the "biggest girl group in the world", they are recognized as a leading force in the Korean Wave and an ambassador of the "girl crush" concept in K-pop, which explores themes of self-confidence and female empowerment. They were the first girl group to receive South Korea's Okgwan Order of Cultural Merit for their contributions to Korean culture.

Blackpink debuted in August 2016 with their single album Square One, which included "Whistle", their first number-one hit on South Korea's Circle Digital Chart, and "Boombayah", their first number-one on the US Billboard World Digital Songs chart. The group achieved an international breakthrough with "Ddu-Du Ddu-Du" (2018), which topped South Korean charts and marked the first song by a Korean female group to enter the UK Singles Chart and receive a certification from the Recording Industry Association of America (RIAA). Its music video was the first by a Korean group to surpass one and two billion views on YouTube. Their music videos for "Kill This Love" (2019) and "How You Like That" (2020) set records for the most-viewed videos within the first 24 hours of release; the latter topped the Circle Digital Chart and set multiple Guinness World Records.

Blackpink's debut studio album, The Album (2020), was the first album by a Korean girl group to sell one million copies. Their 2022 follow-up, Born Pink, was the first album by a Korean girl group to sell two million copies and to reach number one on the US Billboard 200 and the UK Albums Chart. The album's lead single "Pink Venom" was the first song by a Korean group to top Australia's ARIA Singles Chart and the first by a girl group to top the Billboard Global 200. Blackpink earned further global number-one singles with "Shut Down" (2022) and "Jump" (2025) and has the most US Billboard Hot 100 entries among Korean female acts. Their Born Pink World Tour (2022–23) was the highest-grossing concert tour by a female group and Asian act in history, while they became the first Asian act to headline Coachella in 2023. Their extended play Deadline (2026) set first-day and first-week sales records for a Korean girl group.

With over 40 billion streams and 20 million records sold worldwide, Blackpink is one of the best-selling girl groups of all time. They are the most-subscribed music act on YouTube and the first to surpass 100 million subscribers, as well as the most-viewed band on the platform. They are also the most-followed and most-streamed female group on Spotify. Blackpink's accolades include a Billboard Music Award, an MTV Europe Music Award, and multiple Golden Disc Awards and MTV Video Music Awards; they were the first girl group to win Group of the Year at the latter awards in the 21st century. Outside of music, they have endorsement deals in various industries and incorporate fashion into their public image. For their work as advocates for climate change awareness, the group was invested as honorary Members of the Order of the British Empire (MBE) in 2023. Blackpink was the first girl group to enter Forbes' 30 Under 30 Asia and was named Time's 2022 Entertainer of the Year. The group has been ranked among the top of the Forbes Korea Power Celebrity 40 list and recognized by former South Korean president Moon Jae-in for spreading K-pop and Korean culture worldwide. In addition to their group activities, all four members have also pursued solo careers.

== Career ==
=== 2010–2016: Formation and pre-debut activities ===
Blackpink began forming in 2010 when YG Entertainment held tryouts worldwide for preteen or teenage recruits to create a new girl group after launching its first major one, 2NE1, the previous year. According to the members, joining the label as trainees was akin to enrolling in a full-time pop-star academy, with Jennie describing the experience as "more strict than school" and Rosé comparing it to The X Factor with dorm rooms. For members who had left their lives outside of South Korea, the pace of training alongside the culture shock was especially difficult. Preparations for Blackpink's debut began as early as 2011, when YG Entertainment revealed on November 14 that their new girl group would debut in the early half of 2012 and feature at least seven members. Consequently, numerous news stories and rumors surfaced surrounding the new girl group's debut being delayed, although there had been no official information. It was until May 18, 2016, that YG Entertainment confirmed the girl group would debut that July, stating that the members were selected through years of stiff competition. The label later confirmed that Jang Hanna and Moon Sua, who were introduced to the public as potential members of the new girl group, were not included in the lineup.

Jennie, the group's main rapper and lead vocalist, was the first member revealed on June 1, 2016. She joined YG Entertainment as a trainee in 2010 after moving back to South Korea from New Zealand. She had been introduced to the public for the first time in 2012 in a photo titled "Who's that girl?" on YG Entertainment's website on April 10. Jennie continued to be promoted as a member of the new girl group through multiple collaborations: she starred in the music video for G-Dragon's "That XX" (2012) from his EP One of a Kind and featured in the songs "Black" (2013), from his album Coup d'Etat, and "Special" (2013), from Lee Hi's album First Love. Lisa, the group's main rapper and main dancer, was revealed as the second member on June 8, 2016. She was the only individual among 4,000 applicants to pass the 2010 YG Entertainment audition in her native country, Thailand, and became the label's first foreign trainee in 2011. She was first introduced in May 2012 in a video that was posted on YG Entertainment's YouTube channel, titled "Who's that girl???". Lisa also appeared in the music video for Taeyang's "Ringa Linga" in 2013. She became a spokesperson for YG's streetwear brand Nona9on in 2015 and its cosmetics brand Moonshot in 2016.

Jisoo, the group's lead vocalist, was revealed as the third member on June 15, 2016. She joined YG Entertainment as a trainee in July 2011 and appeared in several advertisements and music videos in her pre-debut years, including the music videos for Epik High's "Spoiler + Happy Ending" (2014) from their album Shoebox and Hi Suhyun's "I'm Different" (2014). Jisoo also made a cameo appearance in the 2015 drama The Producers. Rosé, the group's main vocalist and lead dancer, was the final member to be revealed, on June 22, 2016. She ranked first among 700 applicants in the 2012 YG Entertainment audition in Australia, after which she signed a trainee contract with the label and moved to Seoul to begin training. She featured in G-Dragon's track "Without You" (2012) from One of a Kind, credited as "? from YG New Girl Group" until her official public introduction.

The official logo of Blackpink

On June 29, YG Entertainment confirmed that the new girl group would have four members instead of the originally planned nine and revealed its official name as Blackpink. According to a label representative, the group's name meant "pretty isn't everything" and symbolized that "they are a team that encompasses not only beauty, but also great talent". Jisoo later disclosed in a press conference that other group names under consideration included Pink Punk, Baby Monster, and Magnum. Blackpink released their first dance practice video on July 6, which garnered much public attention. On July 29, YG Entertainment confirmed that Blackpink's debut would be on August 8, 2016.

=== 2016–2017: Debut, rising popularity, and commercial success ===
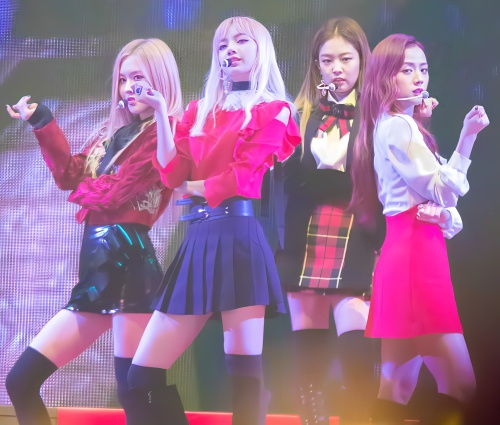
Blackpink performing "Playing with Fire" at the 2016 Melon Music Awards

Promotions for the group's debut began in the first week of August 2016 with the release of teaser images, videos, and advertisements. The first girl group to debut under YG Entertainment in seven years, Blackpink released their debut single album, Square One, on August 8, 2016, consisting of tracks "Boombayah" and "Whistle". They charted at number one and two, respectively, on the Billboard World Digital Song Sales chart, making Blackpink the fastest act to achieve such a feat and the third YG Entertainment artist to hold the top two positions simultaneously, after Psy and BigBang. Upon release, "Whistle" quickly swept all the Korean music charts and debuted at number one on the Gaon Digital Chart. Blackpink's first music show performance aired on August 14, 2016, on SBS's Inkigayo. They won first place on Inkigayo fourteen days after their debut. They wrapped up promotions for Square One on September 11, 2016, with a second win on Inkigayo.

Blackpink released their second single album, Square Two, consisting of tracks "Playing with Fire" and "Stay", on November 1, 2016. The group began promotions on Inkigayo on November 6 and on Mnet's M Countdown on November 10. "Playing with Fire" was Blackpink's second single to reach number one on the Billboard World Digital Song Sales chart and the first K-pop girl group song to chart on the Billboard Canadian Hot 100. In South Korea, "Playing with Fire" peaked at number three, while "Stay" placed in the top ten. Blackpink's commercial success in their first five months earned them several rookie awards at major Korean year-end music award shows, including the Asia Artist Awards, Melon Music Awards, Golden Disc Awards, Seoul Music Awards, and Gaon Chart Music Awards. Additionally, Billboard named them one of the best new K-pop groups of 2016.

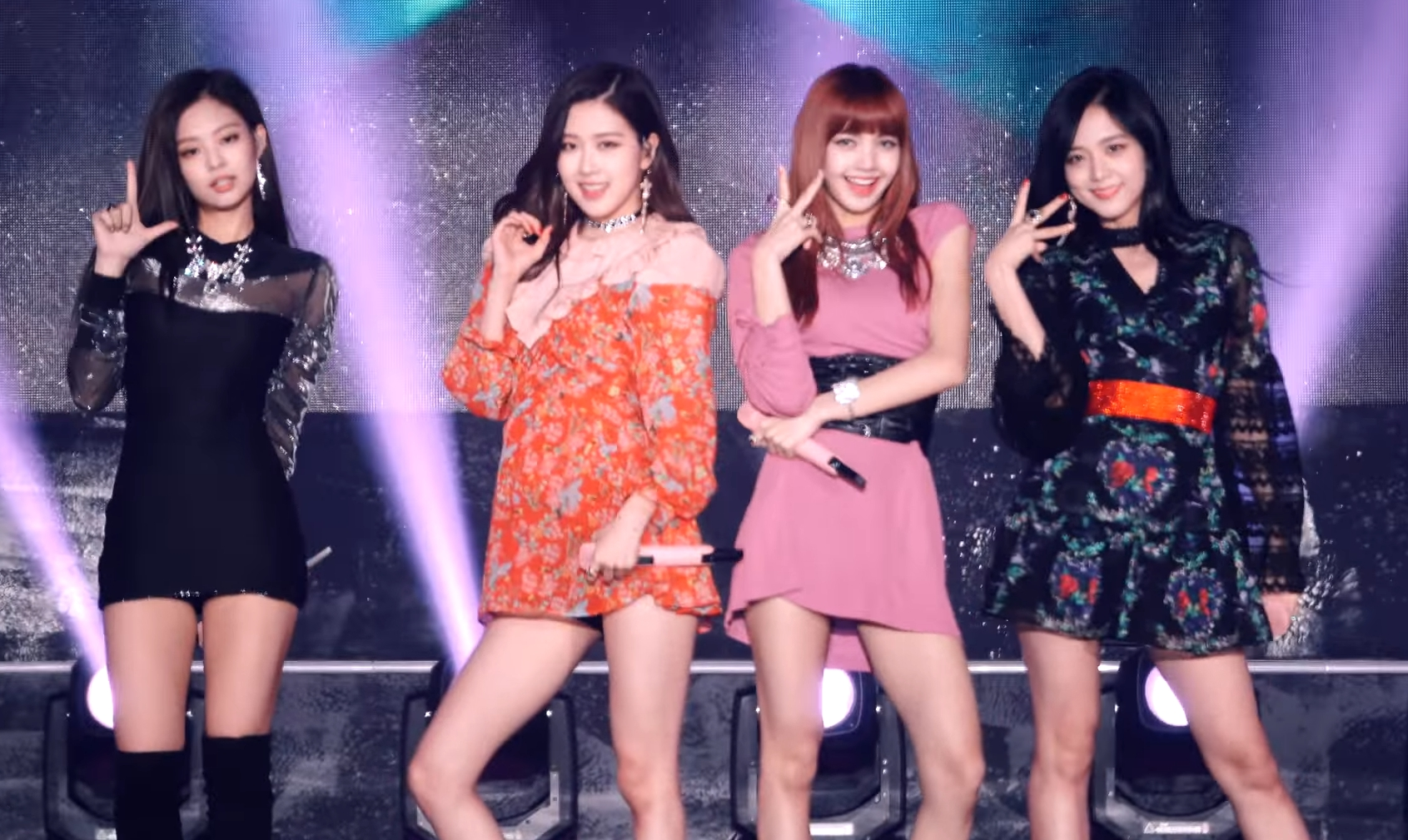
Blackpink performing "As If It's Your Last" at the Korea Music Festival in 2017

On January 17, 2017, Blackpink revealed the name of their fandom—"Blink", a portmanteau of "black" and "pink". On June 22, the group released their first standalone digital single, "As If It's Your Last". According to Jisoo, it involved a change of sound from their previous releases, which featured a "black" concept, and marked their first single with a brighter "pink" concept. The song peaked at number three on the Gaon Digital Chart and at number 13 on Billboard's Bubbling Under Hot 100 chart, becoming their first song to enter the latter chart. It debuted at number one on Billboard's World Digital Song Sales chart one day after release, making it their third number-one single on the chart. The music video for the song later went on to break the record for the most-liked music video by a Korean girl group on YouTube, as well as the most-viewed K-pop group music video in the first 24 hours of release.

On July 20, 2017, Blackpink held a showcase at Nippon Budokan in Tokyo, which was attended by over 14,000 people, with as many as 200,000 people attempting to purchase tickets. The group made their Japanese debut on August 30, 2017, with the release of a self-titled Japanese extended play (EP) through YGEX that included Japanese versions of their previous singles. The EP debuted and peaked atop the Oricon Albums Chart, making Blackpink only the third foreign artist to top the chart with their debut release. Blackpink ranked among YouTube's Global Top 25 Songs of the Summer in 2017 with "As If It's Your Last".

=== 2018–2019: International breakthrough and first world tour ===
On January 6, 2018, Blackpink released the first episode of their first reality show, Blackpink House, which comprised 12 episodes released throughout 2018 following the four members spending 100 days of vacation as they moved into their new dorm, via their official V Live and YouTube channels. On March 28, Blackpink re-released their debut Japanese EP under the name Re:Blackpink. The digital version included the same songs as the original release, while the physical version included a DVD of all their music videos and six songs in the Korean language.

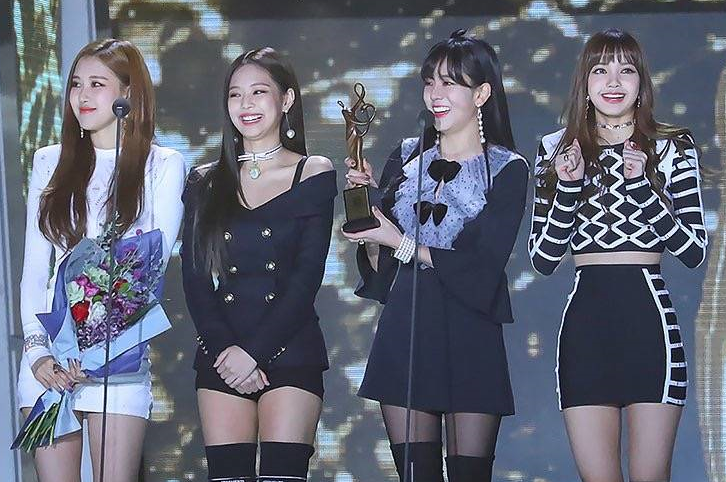
Blackpink at the Seoul Music Awards in 2018

On June 15, 2018, the group released their first Korean-language EP, Square Up. In South Korea, the EP debuted at number one on the Gaon Album Chart and was certified platinum by the Korea Music Content Association (KMCA) for selling 250,000 units. Square Up brought the group their first entry and the highest-charting album by a female Korean group at the time of its release on the Billboard 200, debuting at number 40. The EP also topped the Billboard World Albums chart and led Blackpink to become the first female Korean group to reach number one on the Billboard Emerging Artists chart. The EP's lead single, "Ddu-Du Ddu-Du", peaked at number one on the Gaon Digital Chart, while "Forever Young" peaked at number two; both songs were certified platinum by the KMCA for surpassing 2,500,000 downloads and 100,000,000 streams in the country. In the United States, "Ddu-Du Ddu-Du" debuted at number 55 on the Billboard Hot 100 and became the highest-charting song by a Korean girl group in the country at that time, surpassing the record set by "Nobody" by Wonder Girls in 2009. It additionally marked the first time a Korean girl group entered the US Streaming Songs chart, entering at number 39. The song was certified gold by the Recording Industry Association of America (RIAA) in August 2019, making Blackpink the first Korean girl group to receive a certification in the country. In the United Kingdom, "Ddu-Du Ddu-Du" debuted at number 78 on the UK singles Chart and made Blackpink the first female Korean group to enter the chart. YouTube's official tally saw the music video for "Ddu-Du Ddu-Du" garner a total of 36.2 million views within 24 hours after its release, making it the most-viewed online video in the first 24 hours by a Korean act and the second most-watched music video of all time in the first 24 hours of release at the time. It became the most-watched music video by a South Korean group in January 2019 and became the first K-pop group music video to surpass one billion views in November 2019 and two billion views in January 2023. "Ddu-Du Ddu-Du" was named the Song of the Year by South Korean research company Gallup Korea's annual public survey conducted in 2018.

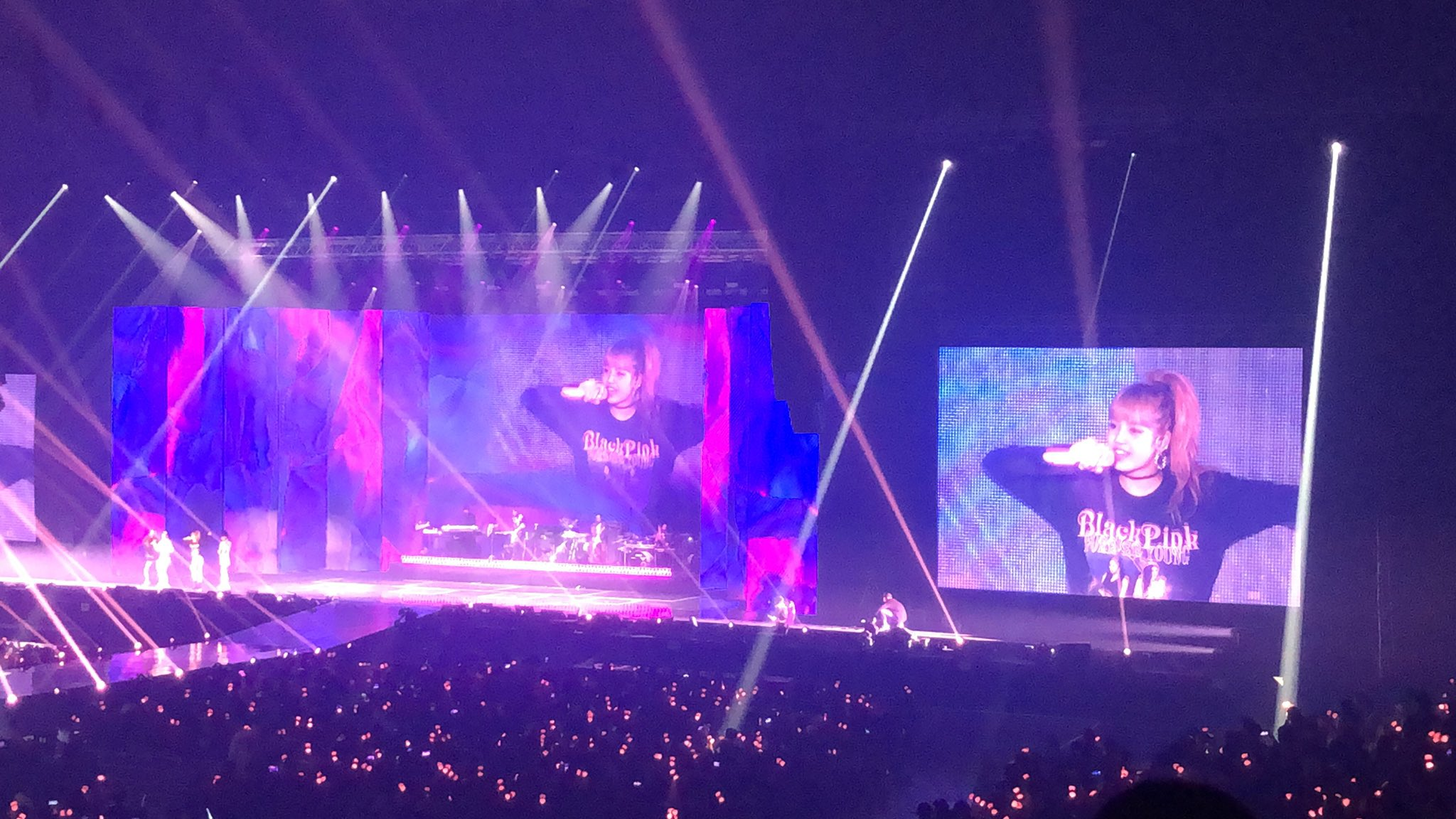
A crowd at Blackpink's Seoul concert on their In Your Area Tour in 2018

Blackpink embarked on their sold-out first Japan tour, Blackpink Arena Tour 2018, in Osaka from July 24 to 25 to promote their Japanese EP. The tour was initially set for six shows across Osaka, Fukuoka and Chiba, but an additional show in Chiba was added due to overwhelming demand. A final tour stop was later added for December 24 at the Kyocera Dome Osaka as a Christmas gift for fans, where Blackpink performed to a sold-out crowd of 50,000 people. On September 12, it was announced that the group would hold their first concert in Seoul, Blackpink 2018 Tour [In Your Area] Seoul x BC Card, at the Olympic Gymnastics Arena. The concert was the first show of the In Your Area World Tour, which continued throughout 2019 and early 2020 in North America, Europe, Oceania and Asia. By the end of its run, the tour had become the highest-grossing tour by a Korean girl group.

On October 19, 2018, English singer Dua Lipa released "Kiss and Make Up" with Blackpink, a new track on the re-released edition of her self-titled debut album. "Kiss and Make Up" became the group's second entry on the UK singles Chart, peaking at number 36, which made it the first top-40 hit by a female Korean group. It also debuted at number 93 on the Billboard Hot 100, marking Blackpink's second entry on the chart and making them the only Korean girl group to score multiple entries on the chart. The song was certified silver in the UK by the British Phonographic Industry (BPI), marking the first time a Korean group received a certification in the UK. It was also the first song by a Korean group to be certified platinum by the Australian Recording Industry Association (ARIA). On October 23, the group signed with Interscope Records in a global partnership with YG Entertainment; their representation outside Asia was to be handled by Interscope and Universal Music Group. In November 2018, Blackpink announced additional tour dates for their In Your Area World Tour, which covered various dates across Asia from January to March 2019. Jennie made her solo debut with her single "Solo" at Blackpink's Seoul concert on November 11; both the song and its official music video were released the following day. Their first Japanese studio album, Blackpink in Your Area, was made available digitally on November 23 and physically on December 5. The album included Japanese versions of all of their previous releases and debuted at number nine on the Oricon Albums Chart.

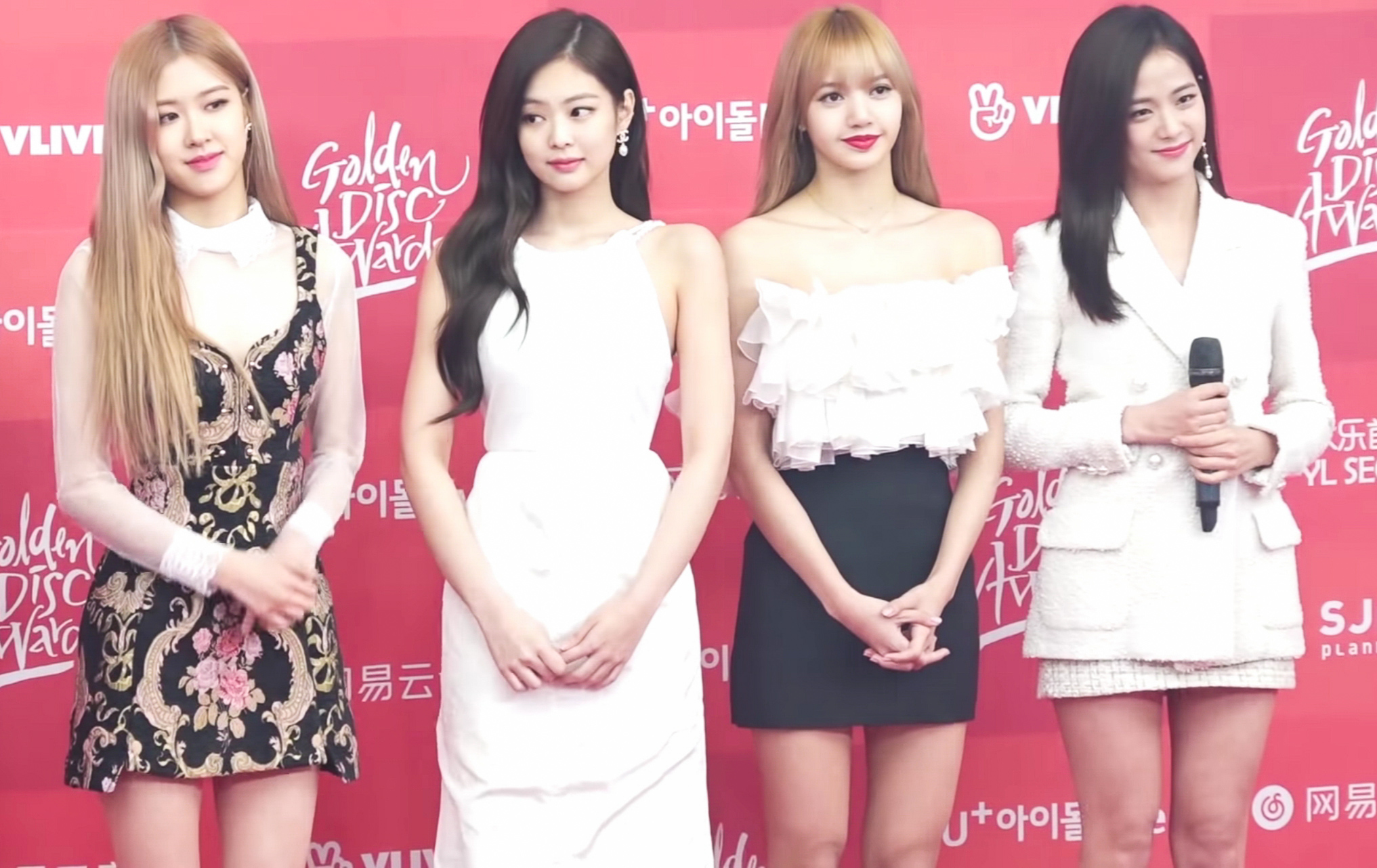
Blackpink at the 33rd Golden Disc Awards in 2019

Blackpink made their American debut at the Universal Music Group's 2019 Grammy Artist Showcase, an invite-only event at the ROW in Downtown Los Angeles on February 9, 2019. The group subsequently appeared on several American television shows, including The Late Show with Stephen Colbert and Good Morning America. That March, they became the first K-pop girl group to cover Billboard magazine. Blackpink's third extended play, Kill This Love, was released on April 5, 2019, alongside its lead single of the same name. In South Korea, the EP debuted at number three on the Gaon Album Chart and was certified 2× platinum by the KMCA for selling 500,000 units in the country, while the lead single peaked at number two on the Gaon Digital Chart and was certified platinum for surpassing 100,000,000 streams in the country. Kill This Love also debuted at number 24 on the Billboard 200, while the lead single reached number 41 on the Hot 100, becoming the highest-charting releases by a female Korean group on the two major Billboard charts. The EP also became Blackpink's second number-one album on the Billboard World Albums chart. The song's music video broke the record for the most views within 24 hours on YouTube, accumulating 56.7 million views in that time. "Kill This Love" ranked at number 66 on Billboard's list of the 100 Best Songs of 2019.

Following the EP's release, Blackpink performed at the 2019 Coachella Valley Music and Arts Festival on April 12 and 19, 2019, making them the first female K-pop group to do so. The group's Coachella set was well received by both critics and fans alike, with Gab Ginsberg of Billboard calling the show "electrifying" and "unforgettable". On October 16, 2019, a Japanese version of Kill This Love was released to the Japanese market, peaking at number five on the Oricon Albums Chart. The group embarked on a variety of promotional activities in Japan, including appearances on Japanese music television programs TV Asahi's Music Station and Fuji TV's Love Music. In January of the following year, Blackpink was voted Paper magazine's 2019 K-pop Sensation of the Year in their annual Break the Internet Awards list.

=== 2020–2021: The Album and The Show ===
On April 22, 2020, Lady Gaga confirmed that Blackpink would be featured on the track list of her sixth studio album, Chromatica. Their collaboration, "Sour Candy", was released as a promotional single on May 28, 2020. On the Billboard Hot 100, the song debuted at number 33, giving Blackpink their first top 40 hit and becoming the highest-charting song by a Korean girl group in the US. In Australia, the song debuted at number eight, becoming Blackpink's first top-ten hit as well as the highest-charting song by a Korean group in the country. It also debuted at number 17 in the United Kingdom. On May 18, YG Entertainment announced the group would release a pre-release single in June, followed by an additional single release between July and August, to promote their first Korean studio album. On June 2, YG Entertainment confirmed that following the release of the studio album, members Rosé, Lisa, and Jisoo would release individual projects, with Rosé's coming first. In the midst of the group's comeback preparations, YG Entertainment released a prologue of Blackpink's newest reality show, 24/365 with Blackpink, on June 13, ahead of its launch on YouTube. The show documents their 2020 comebacks while sharing their daily lives through vlogs.

The single "How You Like That" was heavily teased on social media in the lead-up to its digital release on June 26. In South Korea, it peaked at number one on the Gaon Digital Chart for three weeks and was certified platinum for surpassing 100 million streams in the country. "How You Like That" became Blackpink's fifth song to chart on the Billboard Hot 100 and tied "Sour Candy" as the highest-charting song by a Korean girl group in the US with a peak at number 33. Its music video broke five Guinness World Records, including the one for the most-viewed video in the first 24 hours of release, achieving 86.3 million views in that timeframe. The song ranked first in YouTube Music's Global Top 10 Songs of Summer 2020 and won Song of Summer at the 2020 MTV Video Music Awards, making Blackpink the first Korean female act to win at the award show. YG Entertainment later announced that a second single, "Ice Cream" with American singer Selena Gomez, would be released on August 28. "Ice Cream" debuted and peaked at number 13 on the Billboard Hot 100, surpassing their own record for the highest-charting song by a female Korean act in the US. Its debut at number 39 in the United Kingdom made Blackpink the Korean artist with the most top 40 songs in the country at the time, with five.

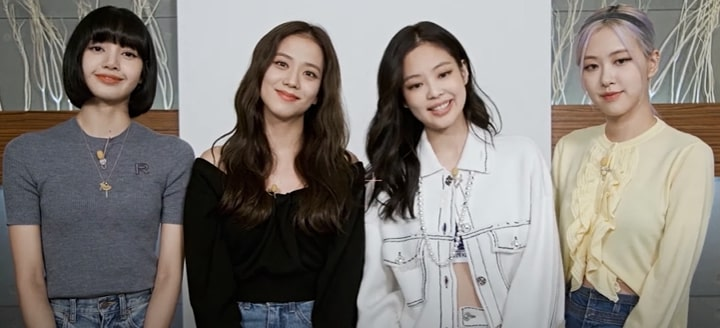
Blackpink in 2020

Blackpink released their first Korean studio album, The Album, on October 2, 2020, with "Lovesick Girls" as its third and main single. Leading up to the exclusive video premiere of their music video for "Lovesick Girls", Blackpink appeared on YouTube's new original music show Released as its first featured artist, which included "unfiltered access" moments of the group. The Album set a first-week sales record for a Korean girl group, with 590,000 copies sold in just one day after its release. Blackpink became the first million-selling K-pop girl group with the album, which debuted at number one on the Gaon Album Chart and sold approximately 1.2 million copies in less than one month after release. It was ranked the fifth best-selling album worldwide on IFPI's 2020 Global Album Sales Chart. The Album peaked at number two on the Billboard 200 and the UK Albums Chart, making Blackpink the highest-charting Korean female act on each. The album's release also led Blackpink to become the first girl group to reach number one on the Billboard Artist 100. To promote the album, Blackpink performed "Lovesick Girls" on Good Morning America and Jimmy Kimmel Live! in the United States on October 21. The song peaked at number two on the Gaon Digital Chart and was certified platinum for surpassing 100,000,000 streams in South Korea; in the US, it peaked at number 59 on the Billboard Hot 100. It also debuted at number two on the Billboard Global 200 and number one on the Global Excl. US, becoming Blackpink's first chart-topper on the latter.

The group's first documentary film, Blackpink: Light Up the Sky, premiered on Netflix on October 14, 2020, and covered the four years since the group's debut in 2016. The documentary included footage from their training days, looks at their home lives, behind-the-scenes stories and interviews with the members, as well as glimpses into the making of The Album. The commercial success of The Album, combined with the group's Netflix documentary, resulted in Blackpink topping Bloomberg's Pop Star Power Ranking for October; they were the first Korean artist to top the ranking since its inception in April of that year. On December 2, Blackpink announced their collaboration with YouTube Music for their first livestream concert. The live event, dubbed "The Show", was initially set to take place on December 27, 2020, but was rescheduled to January 31, 2021, due to new COVID-19 pandemic regulations introduced in South Korea. The concert featured the first live performances of several songs from The Album, as well as of Rosé's song "Gone" from her first solo single album, R. More than 280,000 people purchased memberships to access the show, and the concert was livestreamed across 100 countries.

Blackpink released a Japanese version of The Album on August 3, 2021, with Japanese versions for four out of the eight tracks ("How You Like That", "Pretty Savage", "Lovesick Girls", and "You Never Know"). The Japanese edition of The Album peaked at number three on the Oricon Albums Chart. On August 4, a documentary film entitled Blackpink: The Movie was released in theaters in South Korea and worldwide, which included exclusive interviews with the group as well as live performances from The Show and the In Your Area World Tour.

=== 2022–2023: Born Pink and second world tour ===
On July 6, 2022, YG Entertainment announced that Blackpink was in the final stages of recording for a new album, with plans to record a music video in mid-July and release a new song in August. They also confirmed that the group would embark on their second world tour at the end of the year. On July 12, YG Entertainment revealed that Blackpink would hold a virtual in-game concert called Blackpink: The Virtual in PUBG Mobile from July 22 to 30, including performances of the group's hit songs as well as a special track titled "Ready for Love" to be previewed during the event for the first time. "Ready for Love" was released in full with an animated music video on July 29.

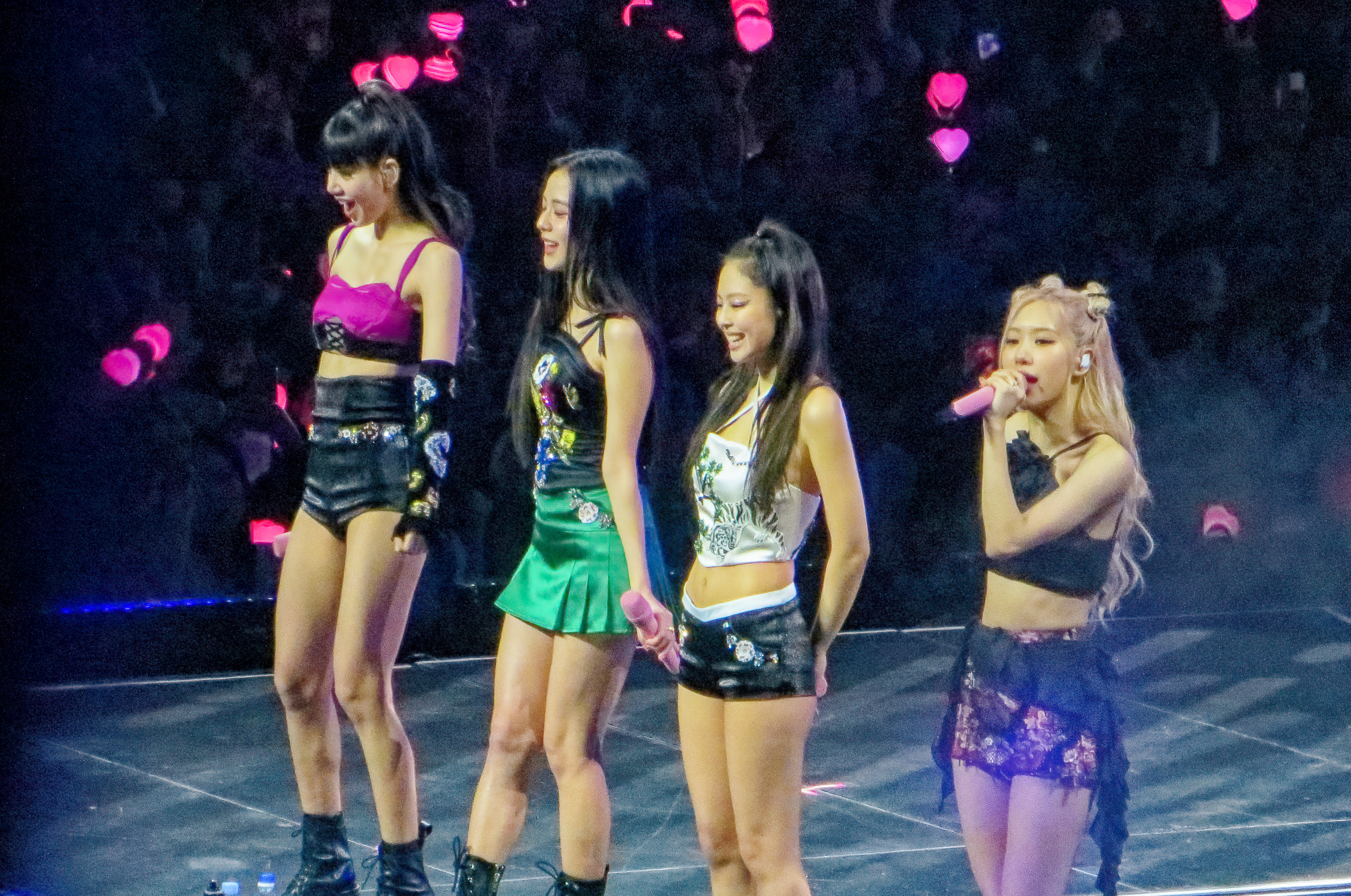
Blackpink performing in London for the Born Pink World Tour in 2022

On July 31, it was announced that Blackpink would release a pre-release single titled "Pink Venom" on August 19, ahead of their second album in September, followed by an accompanying world tour beginning in October. Upon release, "Pink Venom" topped the Billboard Global 200 for two weeks, becoming the first number-one song by a girl group as well as the first Korean song to top the chart for multiple weeks. It peaked at number two on South Korea's Circle Digital Chart, number 22 on the Billboard Hot 100, and became the first song by a Korean group to top the ARIA Singles Chart in Australia. On August 28, Blackpink performed "Pink Venom" at the 2022 MTV Video Music Awards, making them the first female K-pop group in history to perform at the show, and won the award for Best Metaverse Performance for The Virtual.

On September 16, 2022, Blackpink released their second studio album, Born Pink, alongside the single "Shut Down", which became their second song to top the Billboard Global 200. "Shut Down" peaked at number three on the Circle Digital Chart and number 25 on the Billboard Hot 100. Born Pink debuted at number one on the Circle Album Chart with 2,141,281 copies sold in less than two days of tracking and became the first album by a K-pop girl group to sell over two million copies. In the United States, it debuted at number one on the Billboard 200, the first album by a female Korean act to top the chart and the first album by a female group to do so since Danity Kane's Welcome to the Dollhouse in 2008. In the United Kingdom, Born Pink also became the first album by a K-pop girl group to reach number one on the UK Albums Chart, and marked the first time a girl group simultaneously topped the album charts in the United States and United Kingdom since Destiny's Child's Survivor in 2001. The album was the eighth best-selling album worldwide across all formats during 2022, according to the IFPI. In December, the group was named 2022 Entertainer of the Year by Time magazine.

Following the album's release, Blackpink embarked on the Born Pink World Tour, which began in Seoul on October 15, 2022, followed by the tour's North American and European legs through December. The tour contained the first live performances of several songs from Born Pink and the members' solo releases, consisting of the single albums R (2021) by Rosé, Lalisa (2021) by Lisa, Me (2023) by Jisoo, and the single "You & Me" (2023) by Jennie. Blackpink released the reality show Born Pink Memories on YouTube starting on December 2, which documents behind-the-scenes vlogs of the entire Born Pink era, from comeback preparations to touring. On January 28, 2023, the group performed "Pink Venom" and "Shut Down" with musicians Gautier Capuçon and Daniel Lozakovich in Paris at a charity event organized by the First Lady of France, Brigitte Macron, titled Le Gala des Pièces Jaunes. The tour continued in 2023 with stadium shows across Asia as well as several concerts in other continents.

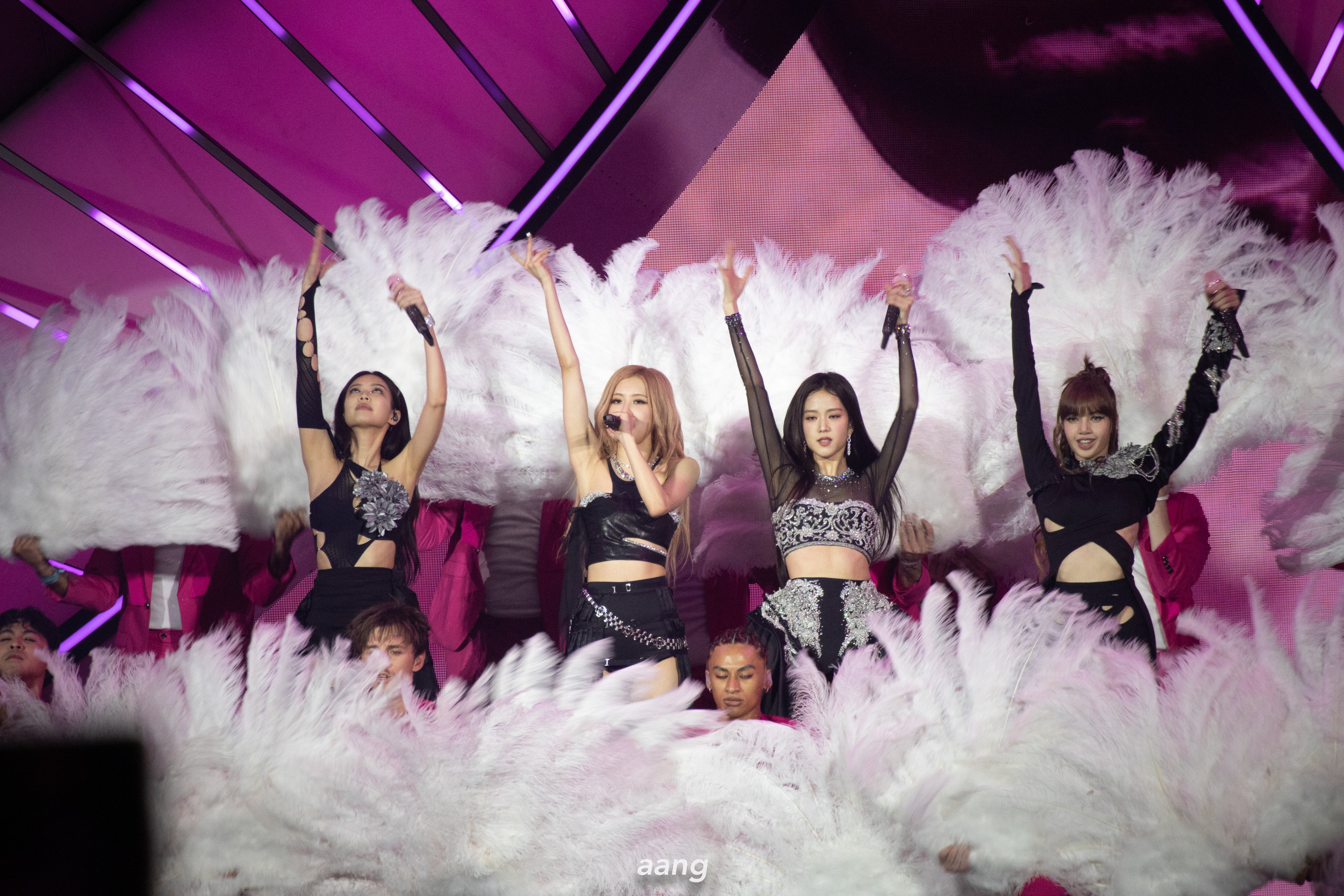
Blackpink during their headlining set at Coachella 2023

Blackpink headlined the Coachella Valley Music and Arts Festival on April 15 and 22, 2023, making history as the first Asian act to serve as a headliner. The group's headlining set at Coachella was received positively by fans and critics, who praised their confident, energizing performance and described it as a historic moment for the representation of K-pop on a global stage. On July 2, Blackpink became the first Korean band to headline a major UK festival with British Summer Time Hyde Park in London. Blackpink returned for an encore stadium tour starting in July in France and the United States. The encore leg set several historical records, including making them the first Korean girl group to perform in a stadium in Europe, the first girl group to perform at the Allegiant Stadium, Oracle Park, and Dodger Stadium in the United States, and the third female act in history after Beyoncé and Taylor Swift to sell out back-to-back shows at MetLife Stadium.

On May 18, the group announced a song titled "The Girls", which was released as part of the soundtrack for their mobile game, Blackpink: The Game, on August 25, 2023. It was released alongside a physical version, which debuted at number one on the Circle Album Chart with 160,460 copies sold in the first week, becoming the group's fifth number-one album. At the 2023 MTV Video Music Awards, Blackpink was awarded Best Choreography for "Pink Venom" as well as Group of the Year, becoming the second girl group since TLC in 1999 to receive the latter honor. The Born Pink World Tour concluded on September 17 with two finale concerts in Seoul; by the end of its run, it drew 1.8 million attendees in total, making it the most-attended concert tour by a Korean girl group. The tour ranked at number ten on Billboard's 2023 Year End Top 40 Tours chart worldwide, leading the ranking of K-pop tours of the year. With a worldwide gross of $330 million, it broke the record held by Spice Girls' Spice World – 2019 Tour to become the highest-grossing concert tour of all time by a female group. The Born Pink World Tour also became the highest-grossing tour by an Asian act in history.

=== 2023–present: Contract renewal and third world tour ===
With Blackpink's contracts with YG Entertainment set to expire in August 2023, the label released a statement to South Korean media in July confirming that contract renewals were currently under discussion and later confirmed with another statement in November that they were "still negotiating with the artists regarding their exclusive contracts." On November 15, Billboard announced Blackpink: A VR Encore, a version of the group's Seoul encore show made for virtual reality in partnership with Meta. Produced by the Diamond Bros, the 70-minute concert premiered in VR in Meta Horizon Worlds. On December 5, 2023, YG Entertainment confirmed that all four members of Blackpink had renewed their contracts for group activities and promised a new album and world tour to come. On December 29, the label announced that the members had not renewed their individual contracts and would pursue solo activities independently while continuing group activities under YG Entertainment. Jennie, Jisoo and Lisa subsequently established their own agencies, while Rosé signed with The Black Label.

A concert film celebrating the group's eighth debut anniversary entitled Blackpink World Tour [Born Pink] in Cinemas was released in theaters across 110 countries worldwide starting on July 31, 2024, consisting of their performances from Seoul's Gocheok Dome alongside footage from other cities on the tour. Blackpink hosted a "pink carpet" event on August 9 for the film at Times Square in Yeongdeungpo District, Seoul. They also held a fan sign event in Seoul on August 8, the date of their eighth anniversary, to which 88 fans on Weverse received invites through a lucky draw. YG Entertainment's founder Yang Hyun-suk confirmed a 2025 comeback and world tour from Blackpink in a video released in July 2024 detailing the label's upcoming plans.

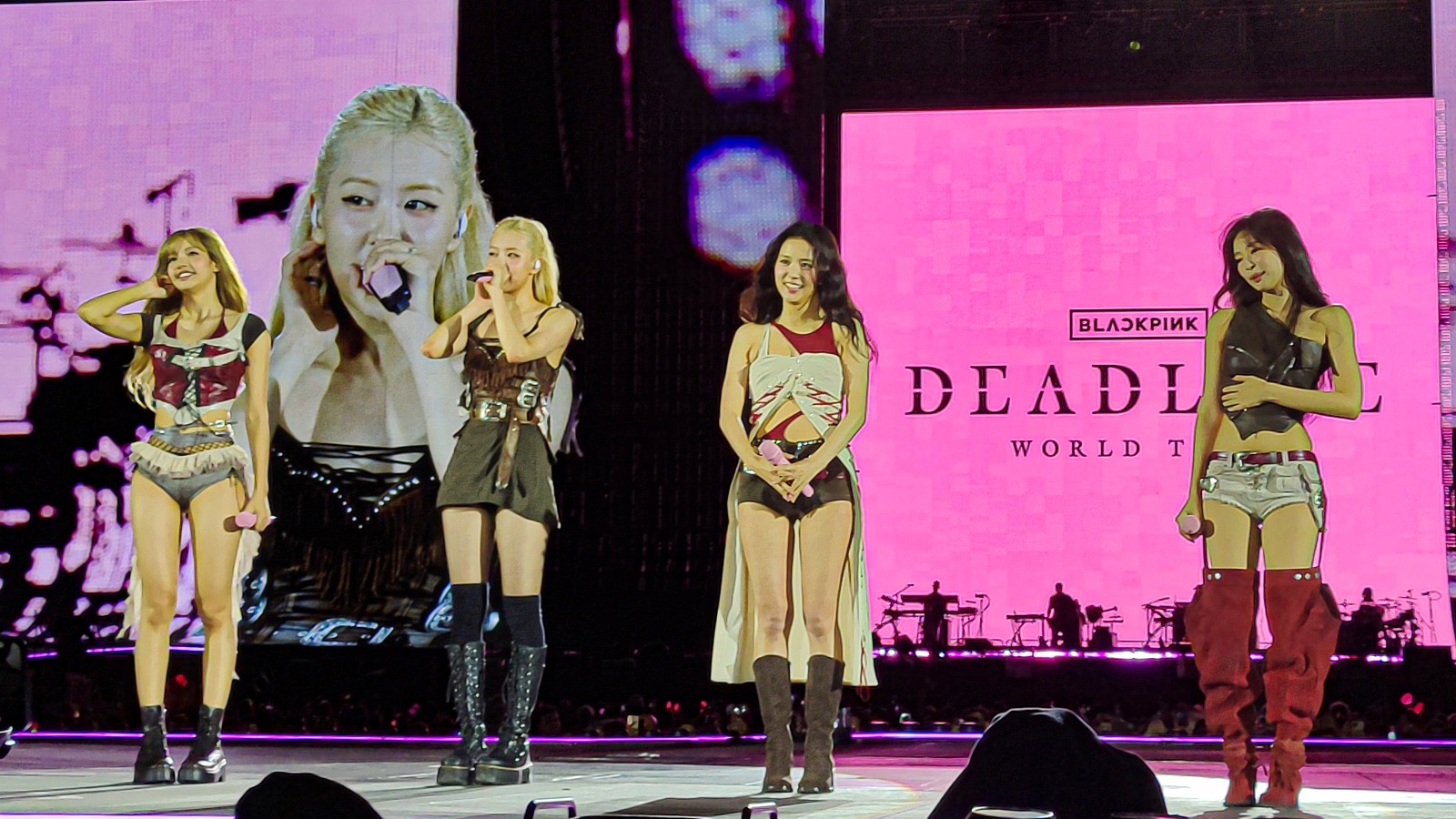
Blackpink performing in Milan for the Deadline World Tour in 2025

Blackpink released the first teaser video for their upcoming tour on February 5, 2025. On February 19, the group announced dates for a world tour kicking off on July 5 at Goyang Stadium in Goyang and then heading to stadiums in North America and Europe, including London's Wembley Stadium, making them the first K-pop girl group to perform at the venue. The tour's title was revealed as the Deadline World Tour on May 16. On June 23, YG Entertainment announced that Blackpink would first reveal their comeback single at the tour's first show in Goyang. Following its debut performance on July 5, the single "Jump" was officially released on July 11 through YG Entertainment in a new distribution partnership with the Orchard, replacing the group's previous distributor Interscope. It became their third song to top the Billboard Global 200 and their fourth to top the Billboard Global Excl. US, making Blackpink the female act with the most number ones in the latter chart's history. The song also peaked at number two on the Circle Digital Chart and number 28 on the US Billboard Hot 100, earning the group their tenth entry on the latter chart.

On January 14, 2026, Blackpink officially announced their third Korean extended play Deadline. The EP was released on February 27, alongside its second single and lead track "Go". Upon release, Deadline sold 1,461,785 copies in its first day and broke the record for the highest first-day sales for a K-pop girl group in Hanteo Chart history. Blackpink became the first girl group in the chart's history to have two or more albums sell over 1 million copies on the first day of release, following Born Pink. Deadline also sold 1,774,577 copies on the Hanteo Chart in its first week following its release, setting a new record for a K-pop girl group. On the Circle Album Chart, Deadline debuted at number one with 1,756,992 copies sold in less than two days of tracking, becoming the group's sixth number-one album. In the United States, the EP debuted at number eight and became Blackpink's third top-ten album on the Billboard 200. Its single "Go" peaked at number 10 on the Circle Digital Chart and number 63 on the US Billboard Hot 100, which marked Blackpink’s 11th entry on the latter, the most among K-pop female artists.

To celebrate their 10th debut anniversary, Blackpink held a meet-and-greet at the National Museum of Korea in Seoul on August 8, 2026, for 40 fans selected through Weverse. The anniversary preparations drew criticism for the event's short notice, limited scale, and initial uncertainty over whether all four members would attend. The members subsequently apologized to fans for shortcomings in the preparations. Blackpink was not included in YG Entertainment's list of artists under exclusive contracts in its report for the third quarter of 2026. In a statement, the label stated that discussions regarding group activities are ongoing while the members pursue individual activities as solo artists.

== Artistry ==
=== Musical style and lyrics ===
"Ddu-Du Ddu-Du" (2018)
"Ddu-Du Ddu-Du" is characterized by its EDM trap beats and strong hooks, and is regarded by critics for "solidifying" the group's trap sound.

"Lovesick Girls" (2020)
The production of "Lovesick Girls" contains influences from EDM and punk rock, while its lyrics explore owning independence through heartbreak.

Blackpink's musical style is predominantly based on EDM and pop, infused with hip-hop and trap elements. They also use a variety of musical styles throughout their discography, such as R&B, Arabic music, ballads, disco, and rock. Time characterized their music as a fusion of "bold rapping, powerful singing and chic styling"; a signature element in their songs is the frequent use of bass drops, particularly before the chorus, which is considered a defining aspect of their sound by music critics. The Korea Herald came to associate Blackpink's soundscape with "grand intros, thumping bass and trap-EDM choruses". Rosé possesses a soprano vocal range, while Jisoo has been described as a mezzo-soprano.

The lyrical themes of the group frequently encompass topics such as independence, female empowerment, the aftermath of breakups, navigating toxic relationships, and the nuances of romance. Jisoo explained in an interview with Rolling Stone that the members are "involved from the beginning" in their creative process, from "building the blocks" to "adding this or that feeling" and "exchanging feedback". Regarding their work, Billboard stated that Blackpink "rewrote the definition of K-pop and their beauty, it's for them not for anyone else."

=== Influences ===
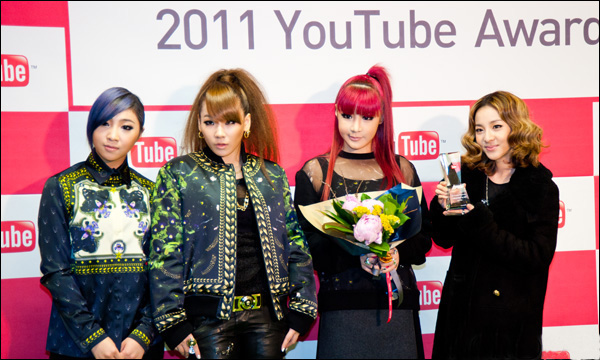
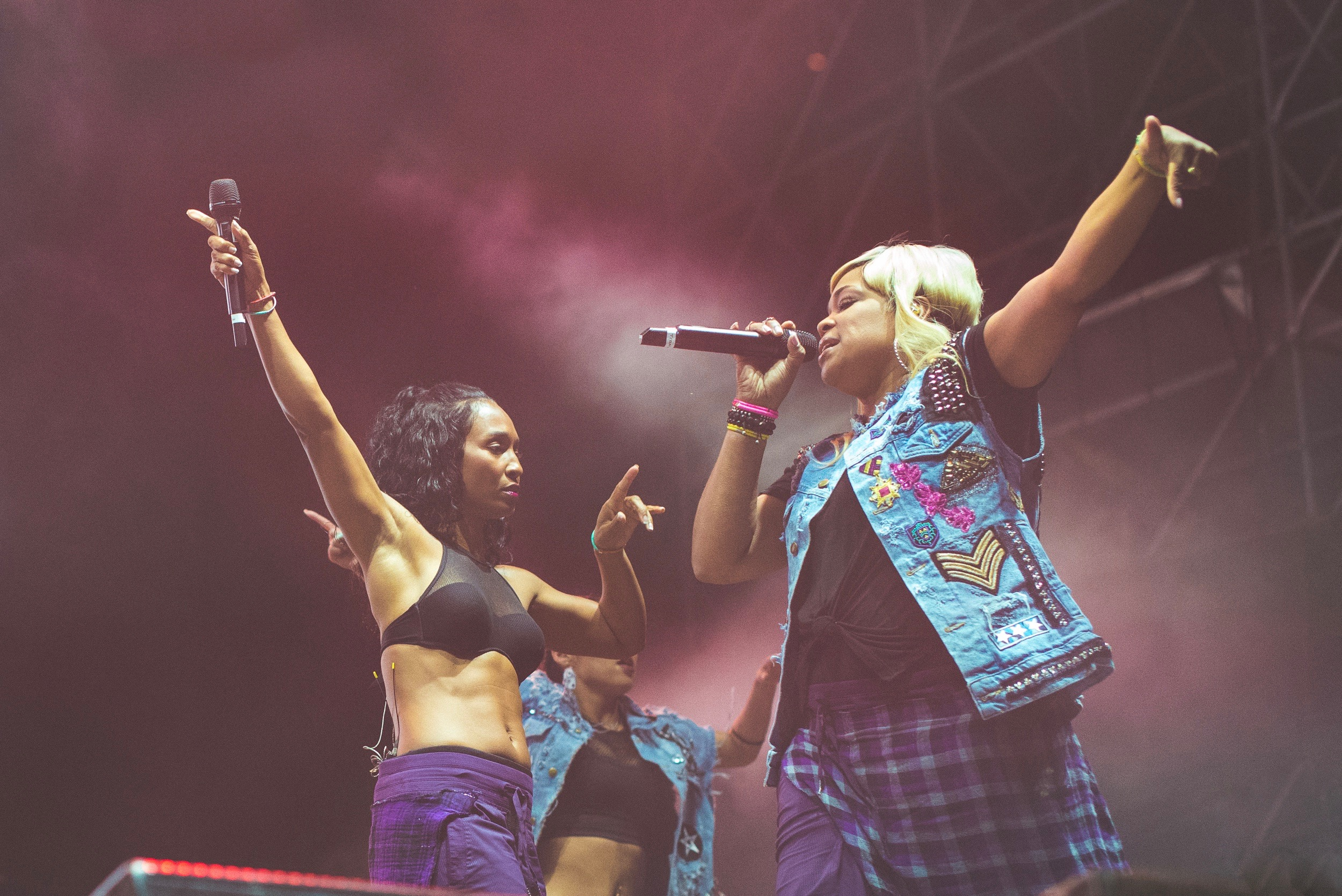
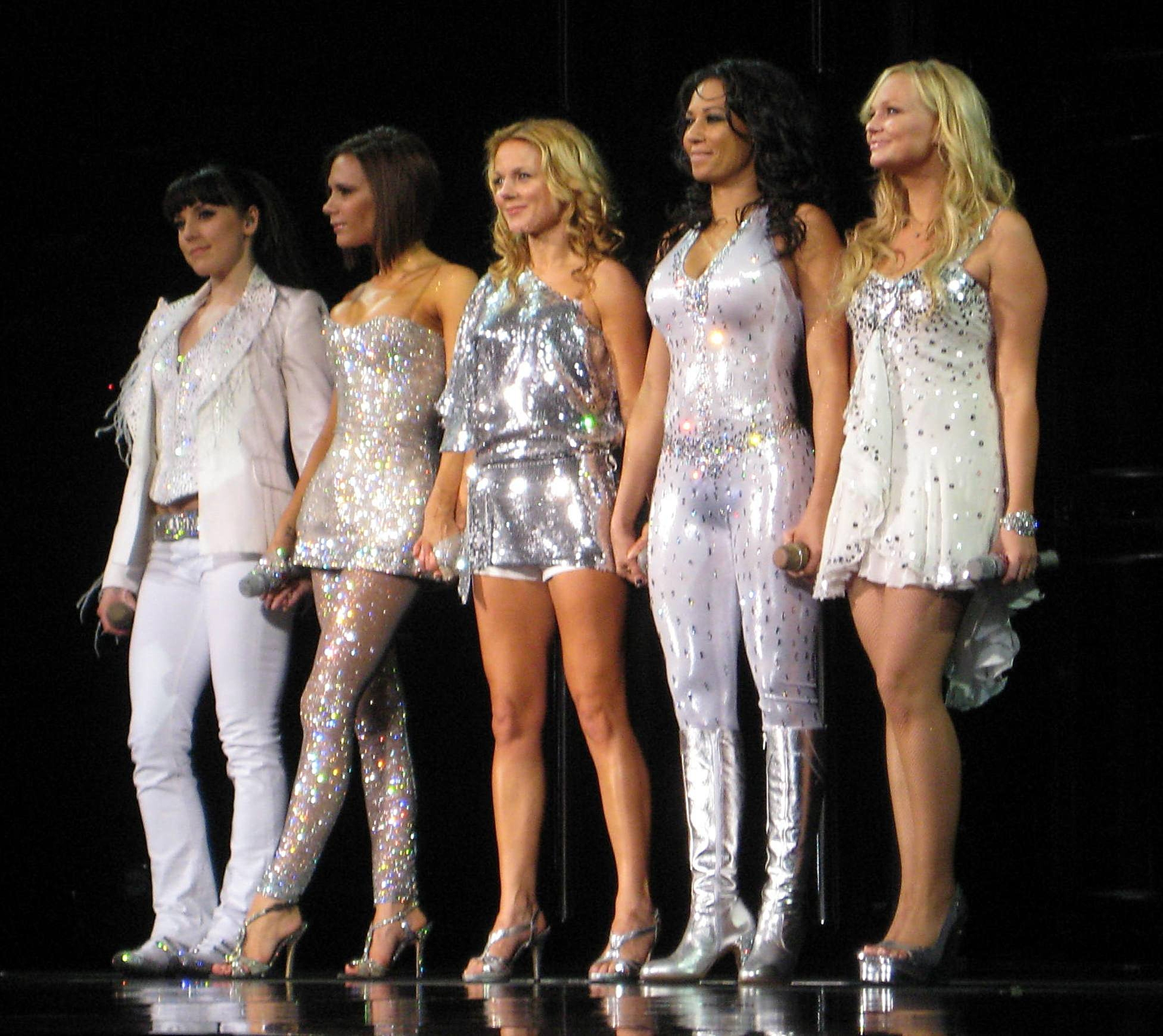
Blackpink's girl group influences include 2NE1 (left), TLC (center), and the Spice Girls (right).

Early in their career, Blackpink stated that they wanted to emulate labelmate 2NE1 and "show [their] own unique color". During an episode of Carpool Karaoke in 2023, the members of the group expressed how they were inspired by TLC and the Spice Girls as they grew up listening to their music. Jennie commented that the group admired the vocals, rap, and hip-hop style of TLC, as well as the distinct individual characters of the Spice Girls, saying, "That was something that we were aiming for and it was such an iconic girl group in history that we grew up listening to."

While working with Lady Gaga for "Sour Candy" in 2020, the group members expressed that they considered her a major musical influence; Jennie recalled how she admired the creativity and fashion of "Telephone" (2010) when she saw the music video for the first time. Other artists that the group has cited as influences include Ariana Grande, Cardi B and Selena Gomez.

== Public image ==
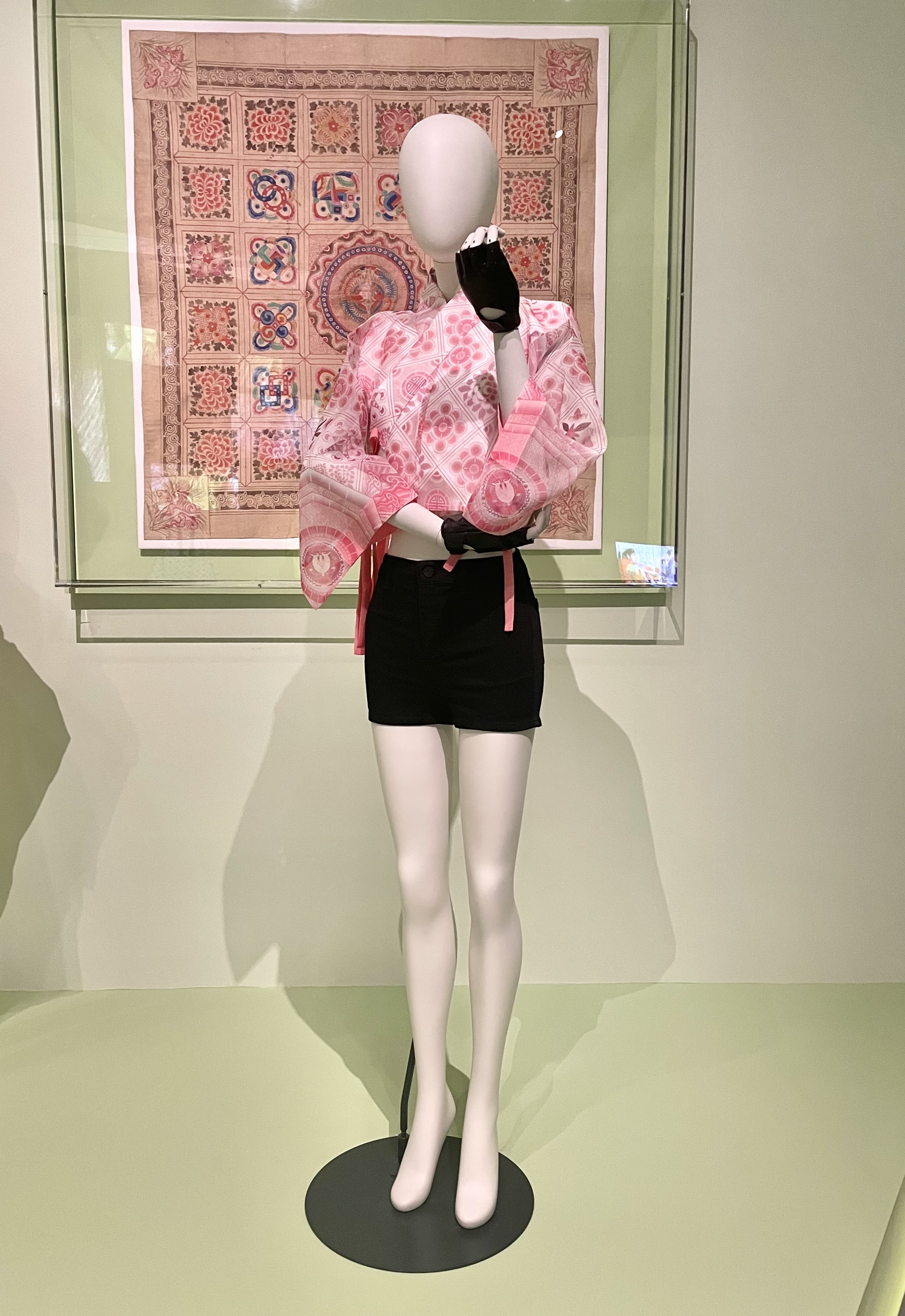
A hanbok jeogori based on the one Jennie wore in "How You Like That" on display at the Museum of Fine Arts, Boston

Blackpink aimed to represent two contrasting aspects of their musical persona, mirroring their name. The "black" facet of the group expresses their edgier, "girl crush" image, while the "pink" facet reflects their more feminine and vibrant image. In an interview with Jimmy Kimmel, Rosé explained that the group feels that "there's two colors that represented us the most 'cause we're very girly but at the same time we're very savage too," naming their song "Pretty Savage" as the song that describes them best because "it kind of goes with 'black pink.'" At the press conference commemorating the release of "Pink Venom" in August 2022, Jennie elaborated on the group's identity: "We try to express various messages through songs of various genres but Blackpink is always confident and full of confidence, I thought we were the closest."

Stylistically, Blackpink are associated with the "girl crush" image in K-pop; Insider wrote that they "[burst] onto the K-pop scene with a set of singles that set them on a path to becoming the ambassadors of the 'girl crush' concept", encapsulating "confidence, sexiness, and inspirational assurance, in the K-pop landscape". Billboard called them "K-pop's most visible representatives" of girl crush following the release of "Ddu-Du Ddu-Du" (2018). Cultural critic Jung Deok-hyeon analyzed Blackpink for having established a confident image in K-pop and for building a "solid fandom" centered on women and female empowerment. News1 commented that the group broke the prevailing notion that only boy groups attract a strong fandom and thereby possess an advantage in the industry.

Blackpink's influence extends beyond music and into the fashion industry—each member has served as global ambassadors for different luxury brands: Jisoo for Dior, Jennie for Chanel, Rosé for Yves Saint Laurent, and Lisa for Bulgari and Celine. Following their attendance at the 2026 Met Gala, The Hollywood Reporter described the group as having become a "staple in the world of fashion", with each member having a multitude of luxury brand ambassadorships. Fashion trade journal WWD remarked that "What Blackpink has done better than any girl group before it is leverage fashion as a tool to position its members as larger-than-life idols [...] [b]ut in carefully edited videos and behind-the-scenes features released by the group's record label, members exude a giddy kind of youth that still makes them approachable." The group has been noted by international media outlets for drawing attention to South Korean hanbok through their modern re-interpretations of the traditional costume in their "How You Like That" music video and performances.

The group considers fashion to be an important part of their public image, with Jennie telling Elle magazine that it "definitely empowers us as much as music does" and Rosé describing it as inseparable from their music. Their style has been noted by South China Morning Post for blending group uniformity with individual tastes. Vogue described Blackpink's "superpower" as the individuality of its members. Hana Tolio, founder of cultural marketing agency The Art of Jeong, noted that unlike most groups in South Korea's collectivist industry, Blackpink are individually promoted with distinct personas, a configuration she argued strengthened their appeal in Western markets.

== Legacy and cultural impact ==
Blackpink, a prominent act in K-pop, have been called the "biggest girl group in the world" by numerous organizations including The Recording Academy, Time, Rolling Stone, Billboard, and the BBC. They were named "(without doubt) the biggest K-pop girl group in history" by Rolling Stone and "K-pop Queens" by Billboard and The New York Times. The group was hailed as the biggest music act in the world in Bloomberg's Pop Star Power Ranking of October 2020, and one of the "world's most influential and bestselling artists" by Rolling Stone. Artists who have cited Blackpink as an influence include Ive, Babymonster, Izna, H1-Key, Tri.be, Kiss of Life, Classy, Primrose, Busters, VVUP, Kiiras, Blingone, Le Sserafim's Kazuha, Illit's Minju, Katseye's Yoonchae, Lapillus' Shana and Haeun, Fifty Fifty's Saena, Kep1er's Xiaoting and Mashiro, Mimiirose's Seo Yun-ju, and @onefive. Director Maggie Kang said Blackpink was an inspiration for the fictional K-pop girl group Huntrix in the 2025 animated film KPop Demon Hunters.

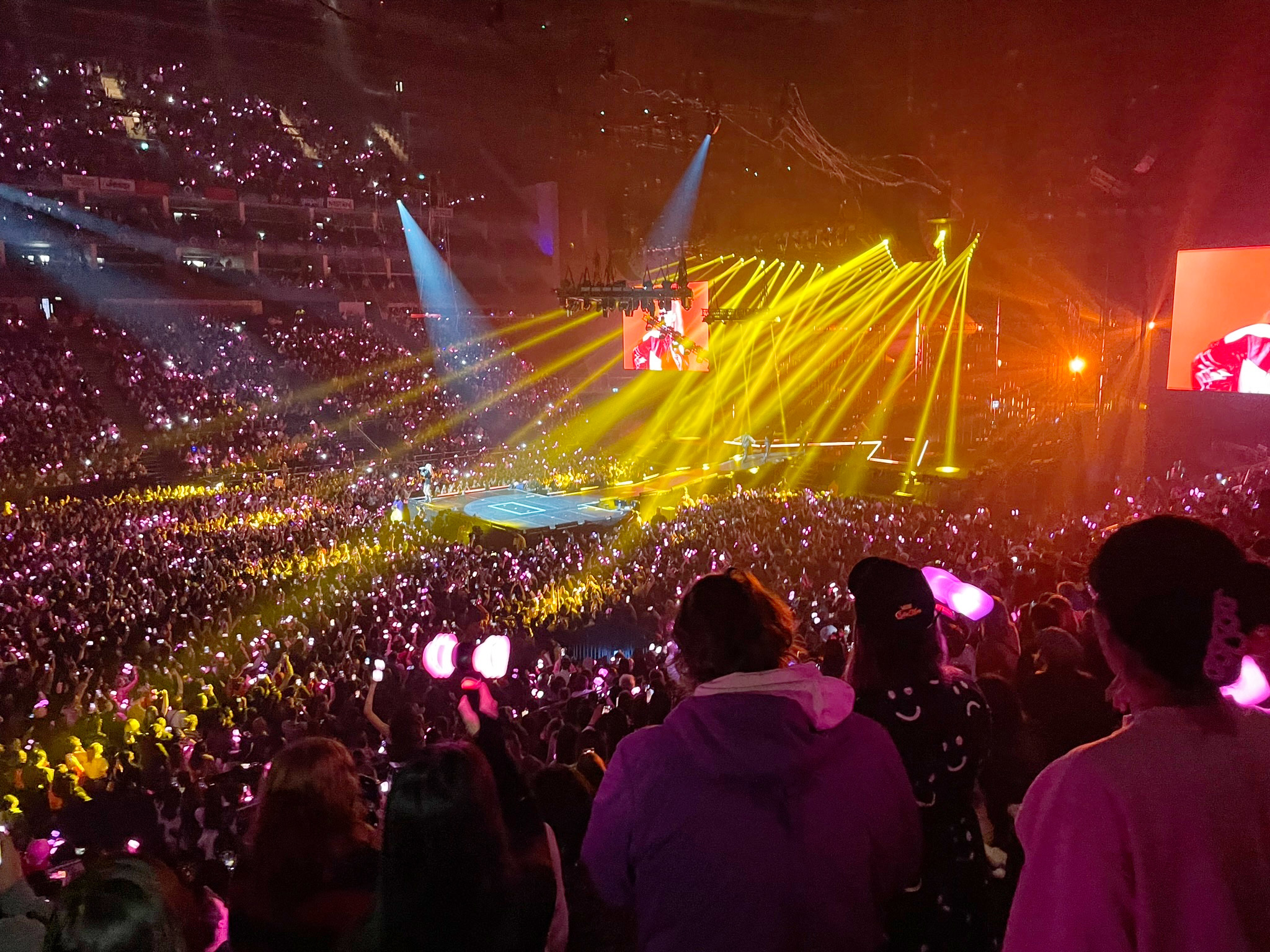
Blackpink's Born Pink World Tour at The O2 Arena in London, December 2022

In South Korea, Blackpink ranked first on the Forbes Korea Power Celebrity 40 list in 2019, third in 2020, second in 2021 and 2022, third in 2023, first in 2024, and third in 2026. In a survey conducted by Gallup Korea done in 2024, Blackpink ranked first (tied with Girls' Generation) as the most beloved girl group debuted in the 21st century among Korean men and women respondents aged 19 to 69 with 42% of votes. They were the first girl group to make Forbes' 30 Under 30 Asia and were named on the 2019 Time 100 Next list of rising stars, credited with "heralding a new era of Korean acts stepping past language barriers to play global stages" when they became the first K-pop group to perform at Coachella, the world's largest music festival.

The BBC recognized Blackpink for becoming "familiar names on the global pop circuit" and one of South Korea's "best-known cultural exports" that contributed to the Korean Wave alongside Squid Game. The New York Times similarly acknowledged Blackpink as one of the country's major cultural exports alongside companies such as Samsung, LG, and Hyundai, with entities like Blackpink, Squid Game, and Parasite appearing "as ubiquitous as any Samsung phone". Bloomberg wrote that, alongside BTS, "Blackpink has achieved a level of global popularity unprecedented in the history of music", while South China Morning Post highlighted Blackpink, BTS and K-dramas as leaders in the global interest of Korean pop culture. In February 2026, South Korean Ministry of Culture, Sports and Tourism's "2025 Global Hallyu Trend Analysis Report" noted that Blackpink had the highest share of major K-pop-related keywords in foreign media in 2025 with 14.2%.

Billboard credited Blackpink for helping "dismantle the lingering walls between 'K-pop' and the American mainstream" and named them "the most successful K-pop girl group to have impacted the U.S. market", citing the group's performances at Coachella and their Billboard 200 chart-topping album Born Pink. The Recording Academy said that "the success of K-pop girl groups shot to a new level when Blackpink entered the scene in 2016". Kim Jin-woo, head researcher of the Circle Chart, stated that K-pop industry insiders "began launching more acts with the girl crush concept instead of going toward the bubbly and adorable direction" following Blackpink's international success. The Circle Chart also noted that South Korean girl groups incorporated more English lyrics after Blackpink's international breakthrough in 2020, the better to increase audiences outside of Korea.

Vanity Fair described Blackpink as a “zeitgeist-altering girl group” responsible for ushering K-pop into the global mainstream. Pop culture critic Kim Do-heon called Blackpink a music group and brand with "enormous influence worldwide" that helped change the perceptions of K-pop artists in the global music scene, putting them "on the same footing as Western pop stars". Music critic Kim Young-dae said Blackpink's global influence was unusual even among the greatest K-pop girl groups, such as Girls' Generation, 2NE1, Wonder Girls, and Twice; it added that just as the Spice Girls were the global symbol of girl groups in the 1990s, "the representative image of today's girl group is none other than Blackpink."

In October 2025, Golden Disc Awards selected Blackpink in its "Golden Disc Powerhouse 40", a list honoring 40 influential figures in the history of Korean popular music. CJ E&M honored the group as one of the ten "2020 Visionary" figures for their contributions in spreading Korean pop culture globally. People included Blackpink in their listing of women changing the contemporary music industry, while Variety put the group in a list of "women that have made an impact in global entertainment". In his 2021 New Year's address, South Korean President Moon Jae-in called Blackpink a leader in promoting South Korea abroad and highlighted government support of such entities as key to "firmly [solidifying] Korea's status as a cultural powerhouse". Blackpink was mentioned by South Korean president Yoon Suk Yeol in a speech during a joint session of the United States Congress in April 2023.

Blackpink have a large following on social media and streaming platforms; they became the most-subscribed music group on YouTube in September 2019, the most-subscribed female artist in July 2020, and the most-subscribed music act overall in September 2021. On February 20, 2026, they became the first artist in the world to surpass 100 million subscribers. To celebrate this historic achievement, the group received a custom "Red Diamond Creator Award." Blackpink became the most-followed girl group on Spotify in November 2019; as of April 2023, they have over 40 million followers. On Instagram, the group's members are the four most-followed individuals based in South Korea. Collectively, they have a combined reach of 412.6 million followers across the band and individual Instagram pages and a combined 151.7 million followers on TikTok as of 2025.

== Other ventures ==
=== Endorsements ===
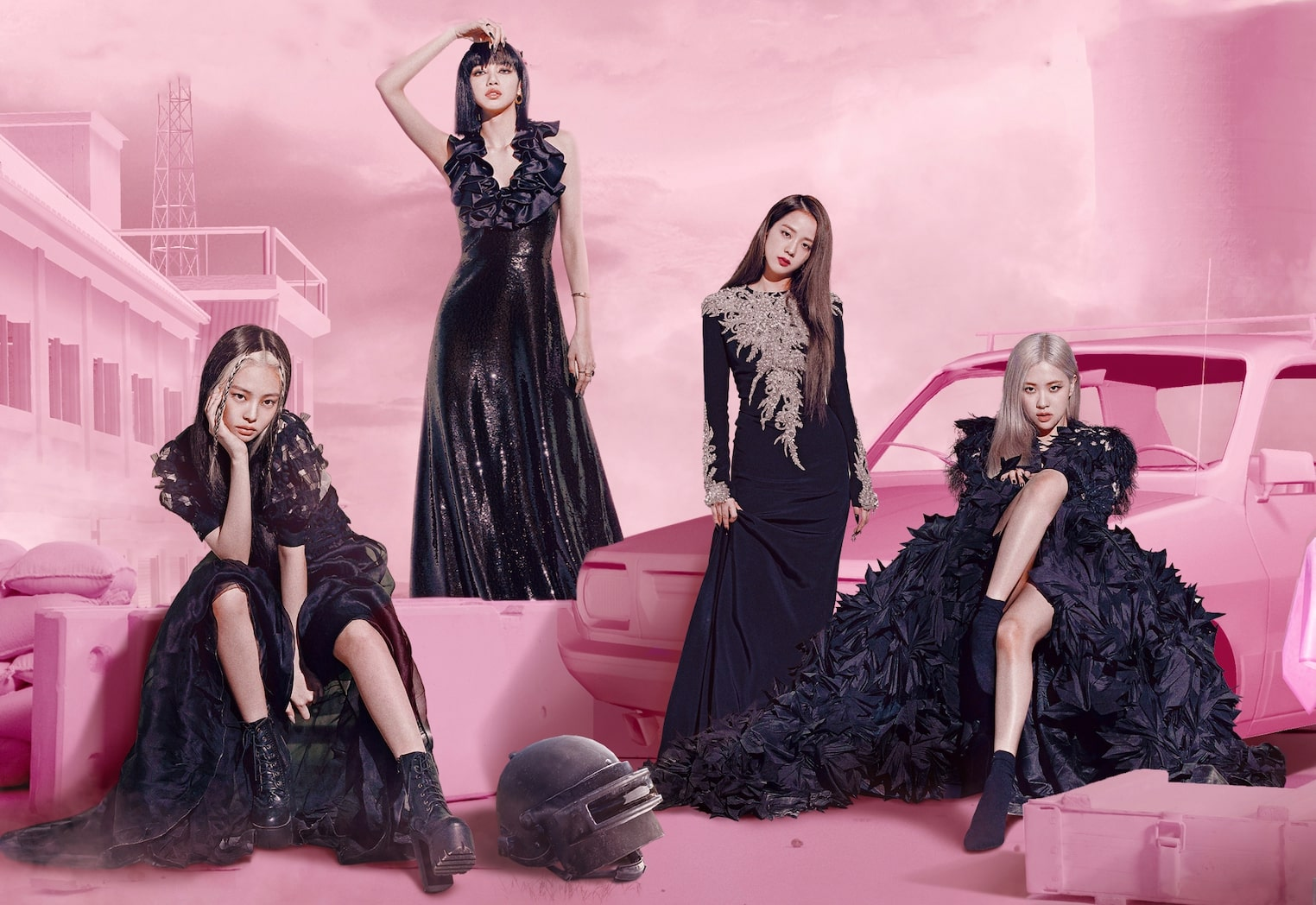
Blackpink in an advertisement for PUBG Mobile

Blackpink has acquired numerous endorsement deals in various industries throughout their career. Globally, the group members were ambassadors for Kia Motors, which also served as the title sponsor for the group's In Your Area World Tour. In North America, Blackpink partnered with toy company Jazwares to create a collection of dolls styled in outfits from their music videos, as well as other collectible toy lines. In June 2020, they collaborated with Zepeto, a South Korean 3D avatar service operated by Naver Z, to offer fans characters that correspond to each member that allow fans to see the characters sing and dance, as well as take pictures together on the app. Blackpink's virtual fan-sign event on the app was popular among international fans, with the service surpassing 30 million participants as of September 11, 2020, and the number of new users increasing by 300,000 following the release of the "Ice Cream" dance performance video. The group also teamed up with the popular battle royale game PUBG Mobile to release collaborative content and events within the game. In July 2025, they partnered with French football club Paris Saint-Germain to launch a limited-edition collection featuring co-branded apparel, released ahead of the group's Paris concerts during their Deadline World Tour.

In Asia, Blackpink endorsed Samsung, working with the company on multiple campaigns to promote its electronics products, such as the #danceAwesome challenge to promote Galaxy A. In August 2019, Samsung launched a Blackpink Special Edition set in Southeast Asia, comprising its Galaxy A80, Galaxy Watch Active, and Galaxy Buds. The group featured Galaxy S10+ smartphones and Galaxy Buds earbuds in their "Kill This Love" music video. In November 2018, Blackpink became the first regional brand ambassador for Singaporean e-commerce platform Shopee, as part of its partnership with YG Group in Southeast Asia and Taiwan. Thai bank KBank began its partnership with Blackpink in November 2019. In September 2020, Blackpink became a spokesperson for Pepsi in the Asia-Pacific region, including Greater China, the Philippines, Thailand and Vietnam. Philippine telecommunications company Globe Telecom began its partnership with Blackpink in December 2020 as its brand ambassador.

In South Korea, Blackpink has been a brand ambassador or spoke-model for Sprite Korea, Woori Bank, Adidas, luxury hotel and resort Paradise City, contact lens brand Olens, and hair-care brand Mise-En-Scène. In May 2017, Blackpink became an honorary ambassador for customs service company Incheon Main Customs; banners and videos featuring their images would greet foreign travelers at Incheon International Airport. The group also endorsed and collaborated with other high-end brands, such as sportswear brands Puma and Reebok, luxury fashion houses Louis Vuitton and Dior Cosmetics, cosmetics brand Moonshot, handbag brand St. Scott London, and department store Shibuya 109. Blackpink also released merchandise in collaboration with Tokyo Girls Collection x Cecil McBee in Japan. In July 2018 and August 2020, the group ranked first among all artists in brand reputation based on analyses by The Korea Reputation Research Institute, making them the only female act to do so.

=== Philanthropy ===
In December 2018, Blackpink donated their prize money from the Elle Style Awards 2018, worth ₩20 million (around US$16,630), to low-income and single-parent households in South Korea. In April 2019, Blackpink made a donation of ₩40 million (around US$33,300) to the Hope Bridge Association of the National Disaster Relief for the victims of the Goseong wildfire in South Korea, doing the same in March 2022 by donating ₩500 million to pay for damage repair caused by the wildfires happening in Gangwon and North Gyeongsang Province. In April 2020, Blackpink released face masks via UMG-affiliated merchandising company Bravado. All proceeds benefited Recording Academy's MusiCares initiative, which launched a relief fund in response to the COVID-19 pandemic and its impact on the music industry.

In December 2020, the group called for action on climate change and promoted the 2021 United Nations Climate Change Conference (COP26), hoping their fans would "join us on this journey" to "learn about what's happening, what needs to happen and how we can play our part." On February 25, 2021, Blackpink was formally appointed official advocates for COP26 in Seoul, where they received a personal appreciation letter written by the prime minister of the United Kingdom, Boris Johnson, for their work in the spread of climate change awareness. On October 23, 2021, the group was a part of the lineup for the YouTube Originals special entitled "Dear Earth", which focused on encouraging viewers to become more environmentally conscious. In his speech for a state banquet hosting South Korean President Yoon Suk Yeol in Buckingham Palace, British monarch King Charles III offered praise to Blackpink's work as ambassadors to environmental sustainability causes.

== Accolades and achievements ==
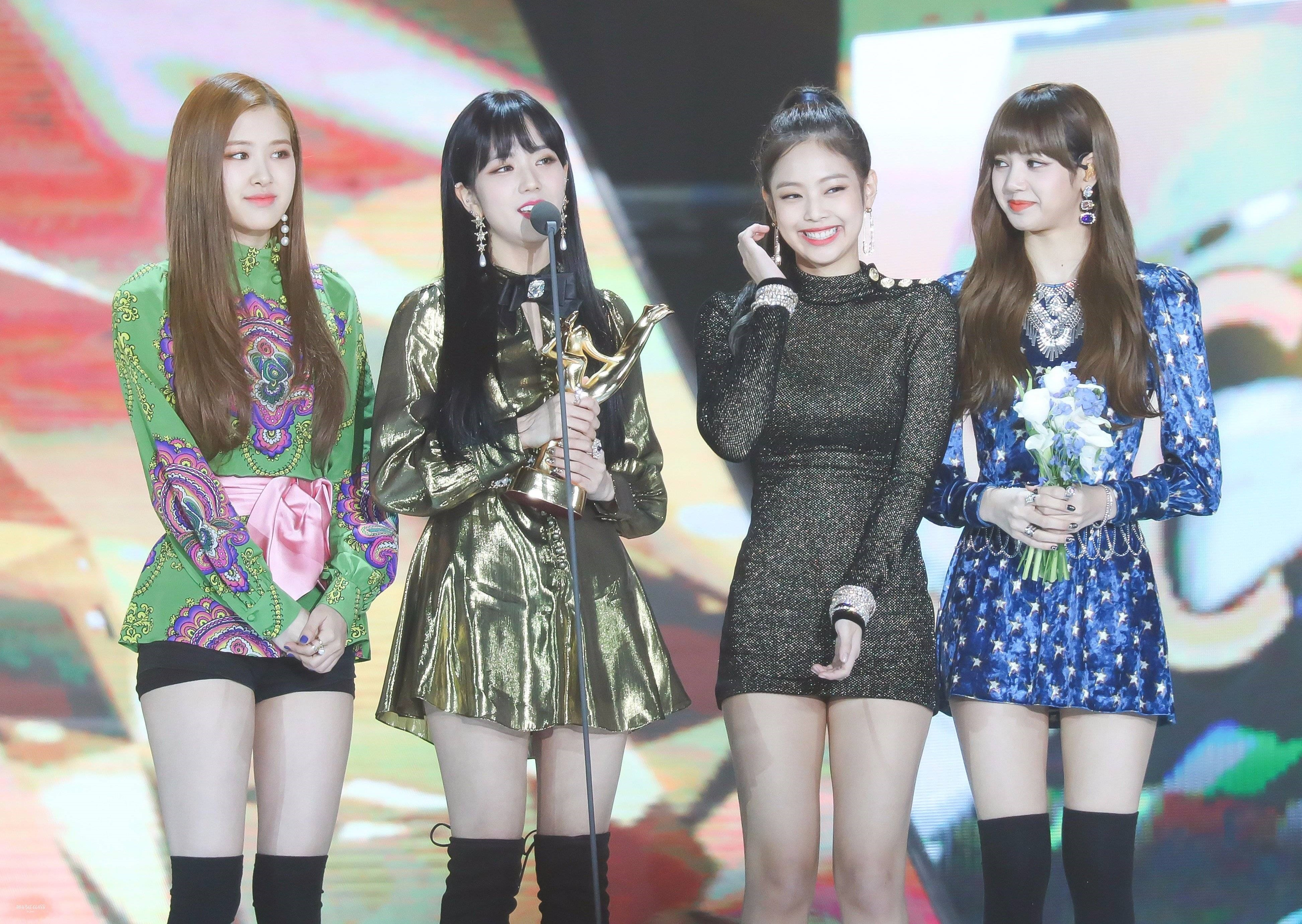
Blackpink at the 32nd Golden Disc Awards

Blackpink's accolades include fourteen Circle Chart Music Awards, eight Golden Disc Awards, eleven MAMA Awards, five Melon Music Awards, five MTV Video Music Awards, three People's Choice Awards, four Seoul Music Awards, a Billboard Music Award, an MTV Europe Music Award, and a Teen Choice Award. They are the first Korean girl group to win an MTV Video Music Award and the first to receive a nomination at the Brit Awards. Blackpink has earned 40 billion official on-demand global streams as of 2024, according to Luminate. One of the best-selling girl groups of all time, they have sold over 20 million albums worldwide.

Following the release of "How You Like That" and its music video on June 26, 2020, Blackpink broke five Guinness World Records, including those for the most-viewed YouTube video in the first 24 hours of release (with 86.3 million views) and the most viewers for a video premiere on YouTube (reaching 1.66 million peak concurrent viewers for the live premiere). In 2021, Blackpink received the Guinness World Record for the most-subscribed band on YouTube, with 60.3 million subscribers at the time. They extended their record to 93.8 million subscribers in 2024, when they were recognized as the most subscribed music act overall on YouTube, and further extended their record to 100 million subscribers in 2026.

In 2022, Blackpink earned three further Guinness World Records, the first for being the inaugural winner of the Best Metaverse Performance category at the MTV Video Music Awards, and the latter two for being the first K-pop girl group to top the UK and US album charts, respectively, with their second studio album, Born Pink. The following year, Blackpink was awarded the Guinness World Record for the most-streamed female group on Spotify, with 8.88 billion streams, and extended their record to 16.94 billion streams in 2026. They were also awarded the Guinness World Record for the most viewed music channel on YouTube for a group, with 30.15 billion views in 2023. They later extended their record for the most views for a band on YouTube, with 41.75 billion views in 2026. In recognition of the group's record-breaking achievements, Blackpink was honored as a Guinness World Record Icon in 2026.

In the June 2022 issue of Rolling Stone, Blackpink became the third girl group in history to be featured on the cover of the magazine, after Destiny's Child and the Spice Girls. Time named Blackpink the Entertainer of the Year for 2022, citing their impact both as a group and individually in the music, fashion, and acting industries. In November 2023, King Charles III invested the members of Blackpink as honorary Members of the Order of the British Empire (MBE) in recognition of their role as COP26 advocates. They were awarded the medals during a special investiture at Buckingham Palace which was also attended by President Yoon Suk Yeol. At the 2026 Korean Popular Culture and Arts Awards, Blackpink became the first K-pop girl group to receive the Okgwan Order of Cultural Merit, the highest government recognition for cultural achievements in Korea.

== Members ==
Credits are adapted from MTV News.

- Jisoo (지수) – vocalist
- Jennie (제니) – rapper, vocalist
- Rosé (로제) – dancer, vocalist
- Lisa (리사) – dancer, rapper, vocalist

== Discography ==
Studio albums

- The Album (2020)
- Born Pink (2022)

== Tours and concerts ==
=== Headlining tours ===
- Blackpink Arena Tour (2018)
- In Your Area World Tour (2018–2020)
- Born Pink World Tour (2022–2023)
- Deadline World Tour (2025–2026)

=== Headlining concerts ===
- Blackpink Japan Premium Debut Showcase (2017)
- 2019 Private Stage [Chapter 1] (2019)
- YG Palm Stage ― 2021 Blackpink: The Show (2021)
- Blackpink: The Virtual (2022)

== Filmography ==
- Blackpink House (2018)
- YG Future Strategy Office (2018) (Note: Cameo in the first episode.)
- Blackpink X Star Road (2018)
- Blackpink Diaries (2019)
- 24/365 with Blackpink (2020)
- Blackpink: Light Up the Sky (2020)
- Blackpink: The Movie (2021)
- Born Pink Memories (2022–2023)
- Blackpink World Tour [Born Pink] In Cinemas (2024)

== See also ==
- List of best-selling girl groups
- List of artists who have achieved simultaneous UK and U.S. number-one hits
- List of artists who reached number one on the Australian singles chart
