= MTV Europe Music Award for Best Electronic =

Category of MTV Europe Music Awards

The MTV Europe Music Award for Best Electronic was originally entitled Best Dance and was first awarded in 1994 until 2003. It was one of the original two genre categories that were added to the MTV Europe Music Awards that year. After an interruption of eight years, the category was revived in 2012, in which it was renamed to its current title.

The biggest winner on this category is David Guetta, with six awards. The second biggest winner is The Prodigy, with four awards. Guetta is also the artist with the most consecutive wins, winning four times from 2020 to 2023. Calvin Harris leads the number of nominations, with 12. He has been nominated every year since 2012.

== Winners and nominees ==
Winners are listed first and highlighted in bold.

† indicates an MTV Video Music Award for Best Dance Video–winning artist.
‡ indicates an MTV Video Music Award for Best Dance Video–nominated artist that same year.

=== 1990s ===
Year	Artist	Ref
1994
1994	**The Prodigy**	
1994	2 Unlimited	
1994	D:Ream	
1994	Jam & Spoon	
1994	Reel 2 Real	
1995
1995	**East 17**	
1995	Ini Kamoze	
1995	La Bouche	
1995	Moby	
1995	Sin with Sebastian	
1996
1996	**The Prodigy**	
1996	Everything but the Girl ‡	
1996	Los del Río	
1996	Robert Miles	
1996	Mark Morrison	
1997
1997	**The Prodigy ‡**	
1997	Backstreet Boys	
1997	The Chemical Brothers ‡	
1997	Daft Punk	
1997	Spice Girls †	
1998
1998	**The Prodigy †**	
1998	Dario G	
1998	Faithless	
1998	Madonna ‡	
1998	Fatboy Slim	
1999
1999	**Fatboy Slim ‡**	
1999	Basement Jaxx	
1999	The Chemical Brothers	
1999	Jamiroquai	
1999	Mr. Oizo	

=== 2000s ===
Year	Artist	Ref
2000
2000	**Madonna**	
2000	Artful Dodger	
2000	Moby	
2000	Moloko	
2000	Sonique	
2001
2001	**Gorillaz**	
2001	Basement Jaxx	
2001	Daft Punk	
2001	Faithless	
2001	Roger Sanchez	
2002
2002	**Kylie Minogue**	
2002	Sophie Ellis-Bextor	
2002	DB Boulevard	
2002	Moby	
2002	Röyksopp	
2003
2003	**Panjabi MC**	
2003	The Chemical Brothers	
2003	Junior Senior	
2003	Moby	
2003	Paul Oakenfold	

=== 2010s ===
Year	Artist	Ref
2012
2012	**David Guetta**	
2012	Avicii ‡	
2012	Calvin Harris †	
2012	Skrillex ‡	
2012	Swedish House Mafia	
2013
2013	**Avicii**	
2013	Daft Punk	
2013	Calvin Harris	
2013	Skrillex	
2013	Afrojack	
2014
2014	**Calvin Harris ‡**	
2014	Afrojack	
2014	Avicii	
2014	David Guetta	
2014	Hardwell	
2015
2015	**Martin Garrix**	
2015	Avicii	
2015	Calvin Harris	
2015	David Guetta	
2015	Major Lazer	
2016
2016	**Martin Garrix**	
2016	Afrojack ‡	
2016	Calvin Harris †	
2016	David Guetta	
2016	Major Lazer	
2017
2017	**David Guetta**	
2017	Calvin Harris ‡	
2017	Major Lazer ‡	
2017	Martin Garrix	
2017	The Chainsmokers	
2018
2018	**Marshmello ‡**	
2018	David Guetta ‡	
2018	Calvin Harris ‡	
2018	Martin Garrix	
2018	The Chainsmokers ‡	
2019
2019	**Martin Garrix**	
2019	Calvin Harris ‡	
2019	DJ Snake ‡	
2019	Marshmello ‡	
2019	The Chainsmokers †	

=== 2020s ===
Year	Artist	Ref
2020
2020	**David Guetta**	
2020	Calvin Harris	
2020	Kygo	
2020	Marshmello	
2020	Martin Garrix	
2020	The Chainsmokers	
2021
2021	**David Guetta**	
2021	Calvin Harris	
2021	Joel Corry	
2021	Marshmello	
2021	Skrillex	
2021	Swedish House Mafia	
2022
2022	**David Guetta**	
2022	Calvin Harris	
2022	DJ Snake	
2022	Marshmello	
2022	Swedish House Mafia	
2022	Tiësto	
2023
2023	**David Guetta**	
2023	Alesso	
2023	Calvin Harris	
2023	Swedish House Mafia	
2023	Peggy Gou	
2023	Tiësto	
2024
2024	**Calvin Harris**	
2024	David Guetta	
2024	Disclsoure	
2024	DJ Snake	
2024	Fred again..	
2024	Swedish House Mafia	

== See also ==
- MTV Video Music Award for Best Dance Video
