= David Hodges discography =

This is the discography of American singer-songwriter and producer David Hodges.

== As performer ==
=== Solo ===
- Musical Demonstrations Part 1 (2000)
- Summit Worship (2000)
- The Genesis Project (2003)
- The Rising EP (2009)
- The December Sessions Vol 1 (2011)
- Passengers:Weapons EP (2013)
- The December Sessions Vol 2 (2013)
- Passengers:Sirens EP (2014)
- The December Sessions Vol 3 (2015)
- The December Sessions Vol 4 (2016)
- The December Sessions Vol 5 (2017)
- Discrepancies in the Recollection of Various Principles / Side A (2019)
- Discrepancies in the Recollection of Various Principles / Side B (2019)
- In The Round (2021)
- The Unattainable (2023)
- The Unavoidable (2023)
- The Inevitable (2025)
- Songs For Grownups (2026)

=== Evanescence ===
- Origin (2000)
- Fallen (2003)

=== Trading Yesterday/The Age of Information ===
- The Beauty and the Tragedy (2004)
- Everything is Broken (2007)
- More Than This (completed 2006, released 2011)

=== AVOX ===
- The Fragile World (2010)

=== Arrows To Athens ===
- Kings & Thieves (2011)
- Exile (2016)

=== Hemiispheres ===
- Grief (2020)

== As writer ==
Songwriting discography
Year	Artist	Album	Song	Co-written with	Notes
2000	Evanescence	Origin	"Origin"	Amy Lee & Ben Moody	Intro
2000	Evanescence	Origin	"Whisper"	Amy Lee & Ben Moody	Origin version
2000	Evanescence	Origin	"Imaginary"	Amy Lee & Ben Moody	Origin version
2000	Evanescence	Origin	"My Immortal"	Amy Lee & Ben Moody	Origin version
2000	Evanescence	Origin	"Where Will You Go"	Amy Lee & Ben Moody	Origin version
2000	Evanescence	Origin	"Field of Innocence"	Amy Lee & Ben Moody	
2000	Evanescence	Origin	"Even in Death"	Amy Lee & Ben Moody	
2000	Evanescence	Origin	"Anywhere"	Amy Lee & Ben Moody	
2000	Evanescence	Origin	"Away from Me"	Amy Lee & Ben Moody	
2000	Evanescence	Origin	"Eternal"	Amy Lee & Ben Moody	(Instrumental)
2003	Evanescence	Fallen	"Going Under"	Amy Lee & Ben Moody	
2003	Evanescence	Fallen	"Bring Me to Life"	Amy Lee & Ben Moody	feat. Paul McCoy; Certified Platinum (ARIA, BPI, RIAA) #1 US Alternative Songs, Mainstream Top 40
2003	Evanescence	Fallen	"Everybody's Fool"	Amy Lee & Ben Moody	
2003	Evanescence	Fallen	"My Immortal"	Amy Lee & Ben Moody	Fallen version Certified Platinum (ARIA) #1 US Adult Top 40
2003	Evanescence	Fallen	"Haunted"	Amy Lee & Ben Moody	
2003	Evanescence	Fallen	"Tourniquet"	Amy Lee, Ben Moody, Rocky Gray	Soul Embraced cover
2003	Evanescence	Fallen	"Imaginary"	Amy Lee & Ben Moody	Fallen version
2003	Evanescence	Fallen	"Taking Over Me"	Amy Lee, Ben Moody, John LeCompt	
2003	Evanescence	Fallen	"Hello"	Amy Lee & Ben Moody	
2003	Evanescence	Fallen	"My Last Breath"	Amy Lee & Ben Moody	
2003	Evanescence	Fallen	"Whisper"	Amy Lee & Ben Moody	Fallen version
2003	Evanescence	Fallen	"Farther Away"	Amy Lee & Ben Moody	
2004	Kelly Clarkson	Breakaway	"Because of You"	Kelly Clarkson & Ben Moody	#1 US Mainstream Top 40; Certified Platinum (ABPD, IFPI, RIAA)
2004	Kelly Clarkson	Breakaway	"Addicted"	Kelly Clarkson & Ben Moody	
2004	Trading Yesterday	The Beauty and the Tragedy	"One Day"	—N/a	Also appears on More Than This
2004	Trading Yesterday	The Beauty and the Tragedy	"The Beauty & The Tragedy"		Also appears on More Than This
2004	Trading Yesterday	The Beauty and the Tragedy	"What I'm Dreaming Of"	Steven McMorran	
2004	Trading Yesterday	The Beauty and the Tragedy	"Nothing But Love"	—N/a	
2004	Trading Yesterday	The Beauty and the Tragedy	"She Is the Sunlight"	Steven McMorran, Trey Graham, Joshua Hartzler	Also appears on More Than This
2004	Trading Yesterday	The Beauty and the Tragedy	"World on Fire"	—N/a	
2004	Trading Yesterday	The Beauty and the Tragedy	"Love Song Requiem"	—N/a	Also appears on More Than This
2004	Trading Yesterday	The Beauty and the Tragedy	"Desert Lands"	Steven McMorran	
2004	Trading Yesterday	The Beauty and the Tragedy	"Elizabeth"	Steven McMorran & Joshua Hartzler	
2004	Trading Yesterday	The Beauty and the Tragedy	"Shattered"	William Reedy	
2004	Trading Yesterday	The Beauty and the Tragedy	"Beautiful"	—N/a	
2004	Trading Yesterday	The Beauty and the Tragedy	"For You Only"	—N/a	
2005	Anastacia	Pieces of a Dream	"Pieces of a Dream"	Anastacia & Glen Ballard	
2006	Daughtry	Daughtry	"What About Now"	Ben Moody & Joshua Hartzler	
2006	Trading Yesterday	More Than This	"Under My Skin"	—N/a	
2006	Trading Yesterday	More Than This	"May I"	—N/a	
2006	Trading Yesterday	More Than This	"My Last Goodbye"	Joshua Hartzler	
2006	Trading Yesterday	More Than This	"Come Back to Me"	Joshua Hartzler	
2006	Trading Yesterday	More Than This	"Change My Name"	Steven McMorran & Joshua Hartzler	
2006	Trading Yesterday	More Than This	"Shattered"	William Reedy	
2007	Backstreet Boys	Unbreakable	"Something That I Already Know"	Kara DioGuardi, Zukhan Bey, Mitch Allan	
2007	Reba McEntire	Reba Duets	"Because of You"	Kelly Clarkson & Ben Moody	with Kelly Clarkson #2 US Hot Country Songs
2007	Trading Yesterday	Everything is Broken	"Knowledge"	Steven McMorran	
2007	Trading Yesterday	Everything is Broken	"Outside"	Steven McMorran	
2007	Trading Yesterday	Everything is Broken	"Soma"	Steven McMorran	
2007	Trading Yesterday	Everything is Broken	"Falling Out of Love"		
2008	David Archuleta	David Archuleta	"Crush"	Jess Cates & Emanuel Kiriakou	
2008	David Archuleta	David Archuleta	"Waiting for Yesterday"	Steven McMorran & Joy Williams	
2008	David Cook	David Cook	"My Last Request"	David Cook, Jess Cates	
2009	Daughtry	Leave This Town	"Open Up Your Eyes"	Chris Daughtry & Ben Moody	
2009	Allison Iraheta	Just Like You	"You Don't Know Me"	Allison Iraheta, Mitch Allan, David Bassett	
2009	Jessie James	Jessie James	"Wanted"	Jessica James, Kara DioGuardi, Mitch Allan	
2009	Carrie Underwood	Play On	"What Can I Say"	Carrie Underwood & Steve McEwan	feat. Sons of Sylvia
2010	David Archuleta	The Other Side of Down	"Complain"	Claude Kelly & Emanuel Kiriakou	
2010	Daughtry	Leave This Town: The B-Sides	"One Last Chance"	Chris Daughtry & Mitch Allan	
2010	Carrie Underwood	The Chronicles of Narnia: The Voyage of the Dawn Treader	"There's a Place for Us"	Carrie Underwood & Hillary Lindsey	
2010	Lee DeWyze	Lee DeWyze	"A Song About Love"	Lee DeWyze & busbee	
2010	Lee DeWyze	Lee DeWyze	"Only Dreaming"	Lee DeWyze & Chris DeStefano	
2010	Katherine Jenkins	Believe	"Tell Me I'm Not Dreaming"	Steve McEwan	
2010	Katharine McPhee	Unbroken	"Had It All"	Kara DioGuardi & Mitch Allan	
2011	David Cook	This Loud Morning	"Circadian"	David Cook & Neal Tiemann	
2011	David Cook	This Loud Morning	"Rapid Eye Movement"	David Cook	
2011	David Cook	This Loud Morning	"This Is Not the Last Time"	David Cook & Chris DeStefano	
2011	Christina Perri	Lovestrong	"Distance"	Christina Perri	Deluxe edition features Jason Mraz
2011	Christina Perri	Lovestrong	"Interlude"	Christina Perri	
2011	Christina Perri	Lovestrong	"Miles"	Christina Perri & Greg Kurstin	
2011	Christina Perri	Lovestrong	"The Lonely"	Christina Perri	
2011	Christina Perri	The Twilight Saga: Breaking Dawn — Part 1: Original Motion Picture Soundtrack	"A Thousand Years"	Christina Perri	Certified Platinum (ARIA, RMNZ, BPIA, RIAA)
2012	Jason Mraz	Love is a Four Letter Word	"The Woman I Love"	Jason Mraz	
2012	Haley Reinhart	Listen Up!	"Spiderweb"	Haley Reinhart & Steven Miller	
2012	Carrie Underwood	Blown Away	"See You Again"	Carrie Underwood & Hillary Lindsey	#2 US Country Airplay
2013	Avril Lavigne	Avril Lavigne	"Rock n Roll"	Avril Lavigne, Chad Kroeger, Peter Svensson, Rickard B Göransson, J Kash	
2013	Avril Lavigne	Avril Lavigne	"Here's to Never Growing Up"	Avril Lavigne, Chad Kroeger, Martin Johnson, J Kash	Certified Platinum (RIAA)
2013	Avril Lavigne	Avril Lavigne	"Bitchin' Summer"	Avril Lavigne, Chad Kroeger, Matt Squire, J Kash	
2013	Avril Lavigne	Avril Lavigne	"Let Me Go"	Avril Lavigne & Chad Kroeger	feat. Chad Kroeger
2013	Avril Lavigne	Avril Lavigne	"Give You What You Like"	Avril Lavigne & Chad Kroeger	
2013	Avril Lavigne	Avril Lavigne	"Bad Girl"	Avril Lavigne & Chad Kroeger	feat. Marilyn Manson
2013	Avril Lavigne	Avril Lavigne	"Hello Kitty"	Avril Lavigne, Chad Kroeger, Martin Johnson	
2013	Avril Lavigne	Avril Lavigne	"Sippin' on Sunshine"	Avril Lavigne, Chad Kroeger, J Kash, Martin Johnson	
2013	Avril Lavigne	Avril Lavigne	"Hello Heartache"	Avril Lavigne	
2013	Avril Lavigne	Avril Lavigne	"Hush Hush"	Avril Lavigne	
2013	Cassadee Pope	Frame by Frame	"This Car"	Cassadee Pope, Gordie Sampson	
2013	Skillet	Rise	"Madness In Me"	John Cooper, Brian Howes	
2013	Skillet	Rise	"Hard To Find"	John Cooper, Joshua Hartzler	
2014	Lady Antebellum	747	"All Nighter"	Nicolle Gaylon & Jimmy Robbins	
2014	Christina Perri	Head or Heart	"The Words"	Christina Perri & David Ryan Harris	
2014	Christina Perri	Head or Heart	"I Believe"	Christina Perri	
2014	Nickelback	No Fixed Address	"Make Me Believe Again"	Chad Kroeger	
2014	Nickelback	No Fixed Address	"Satellite"	Chad Kroeger & Ryan Peake	
2014	Switchfoot	Fading West	"When We Come Alive"	Jon Foreman, Tim Foreman, Drew Pearson	
2015	5 Seconds of Summer	Sounds Good Feels Good	"Jet Black Heart"	Calum Hood, Michael Clifford	
2015	David Cook	Digital Vein	"Firing Squad"	David Cook, Steven Miller	
2015	Nichole Nordeman	The Unmaking	"The Unmaking"	Nichole Nordeman	
2015	Nichole Nordeman	The Unmaking	"Name"	Nichole Nordeman	
2015	Nichole Nordeman	The Unmaking	"Love You More"	Nichole Nordeman	
2015	Nichole Nordeman	The Unmaking	"Something Out of Me"	Nichole Nordeman	
2015	Carrie Underwood	Storyteller	"The Girl You Think I Am"	Carrie Underwood, Hillary Lindsey	
2016	Blink-182	California	"Home Is Such a Lonely Place"	Mark Hoppus, Travis Barker, Matt Skiba, John Feldman	
2016	Blink-182	California	"Kings of the Weekend"	Mark Hoppus, Travis Barker, Matt Skiba, John Feldman	
2016	Blink-182	California	"Teenage Satellites"	Mark Hoppus, Travis Barker, Mat Skiba, John Feldman	
2016	Dan + Shay	Obsessed	"All Nighter"	Nicolle Galyon, Jimmy Robbins	
2016	Dan + Shay	Obsessed	"Round the Clark"	Dan Smyers, Shay Mooney, Jesse Frasure	
2016	Delta Goodrem	Wings of the Wild	"The River"	Delta Goodrem, Steven Solomon	
2016	Lacey Sturm	Life Screams	"The Soldier"	Lacey Sturm, Josh Sturm	
2016	Lacey Sturm	Life Screams	"Life Screams"	Lacey Sturm, Josh Sturm	
2016	Lacey Sturm	Life Screams	"Faith"	Lacey Sturm	
2016	Nick Fradiani	Hurricane	"Love is Blind"	Nick Fradiani, Jaden Michaels	
2016	Tonight Alive	Limitless	"Human Interaction"	Jenna McDougall, Whakaio Taahi	
2016	Tonight Alive	Limitless	"How Does It Feel?"	Jenna McDougall, Whakaio Taahi, Cameron Adler, Walker	
2016	Tonight Alive	Limitless	"Power of One"	Jenna McDougall, Whakaio Taahi, Ben Moody, Steve Solomon	
2016	Tonight Alive	Limitless	"I Defy"	Jenna McDougall, Whakaio Taahi, Steve Solomon	
2016	Keith Urban	Ripcord	"Gettin' in the Way"	Emily Weisband, Jordan Reynolds	
2017	Kelsea Ballerini	Unapologetically	"Miss Me More"	Kelsea Ballerini, Brett McLaughlin	#2 US Country Airplay; 2× Platinum
2017	Nichole Nordeman	Every Mile Mattered	"Lean"	Nichole Nordeman	
2017	The Score	ATLAS	"Never Going Back"	Eddie Anthony, Edan Dover	
2018	Dan + Shay	Dan + Shay	"Stupid Love"	Dan Smyers, Shay Mooney, Jon Nite	
2018	Devin Dawson	Dark Horse	"Placebo"	Devin Dawson, Jordan Reynolds	
2019	Jason Mraz	Know	"Have It All"	Jason Mraz, Jacob Kasher Hindlin, Mona Tavakoli, Chaska Lela Potter, Mai Sunshine Bloomfield, Rebecca Emily Gebhardt	
2019	Weezer	Weezer (Black Album)	"I'm Just Being Honest"	Rivers Cuomo, Ammar Malik	
2019	Armin van Buuren	Balance	"Waking Up with You"	Armin van Buuren, de Goeij, Jaden Michaels, David Naish	
2021	Ed Sheeran	=	"First Times"	Ed Sheeran, Fred Gibson	
2021	Ed Sheeran	=	"2step"	Ed Sheeran, Louis Bell	
2021	Ed Sheeran	=	"Afterglow"	Ed Sheeran, Fred Gibson	
2023	P!nk	Trustfall	"When I Get There"	Amy Wadge	
2024	Benson Boone	Fireworks & Rollerblades	"Lover Of Mine"	Benson Boone, Steven Solomon	

== As producer ==
Production Discography				
Year	Artist	Album	Song	Co-produced with
2004	Kelly Clarkson	Breakaway	"Because of You"	Ben Moody
2004	Kelly Clarkson	Breakaway	"Addicted"	Ben Moody
2005	Anastacia	Pieces of a Dream	"Pieces of a Dream"	Anastacia & Greg Ballard
2007	Backstreet Boys	Unbreakable	"Something That I Already Know"	Kara DioGuardi & Mitch Allan
2009	Allison Iraheta	Just Like You	"You Don't Know Me"	Mitch Allan
2010	Lee DeWyze	Lee DeWyze	"A Song About Love"	—N/a
2011	Christina Perri	Lovestrong	"Bang Bang Bang"	Joe Chicarelli
2011	Christina Perri	Lovestrong	"Distance"	Joe Chicarelli
2012	Haley Reinhart	Listen Up!	"Spiderweb"	—N/a
2013	Avril Lavigne	Avril Lavigne	"Let Me Go"	Chad Kroeger
2013	Avril Lavigne	Avril Lavigne	"Give You What You Like"	Chad Kroeger
2013	Avril Lavigne	Avril Lavigne	"Bad Girl"	Chad Kroeger
2013	Avril Lavigne	Avril Lavigne	"Hello Kitty"	Martin Johnson, Kyle Moorman, Brandon Paddock, Chad Kroeger
2013	Avril Lavigne	Avril Lavigne	"Hello Heartache"	—N/a
2013	Avril Lavigne	Avril Lavigne	"Hush Hush"	—N/a
2015	Nichole Nordeman	The Unmaking	"The Unmaking"	—N/a
2015	Nichole Nordeman	The Unmaking	"Name"	—N/a
2015	Nichole Nordeman	The Unmaking	"Love You More"	—N/a
2015	Nichole Nordeman	The Unmaking	"Something Out of Me"	—N/a
2016	Nick Fradiani	Hurricane	"Love is Blind"	Jordan Schmidt
2017	Nichole Nordeman	Every Mile Mattered	"Lean"	—N/a
2019	Jason Mraz	Know.	"Have It All"	Andrew Wells, Jacob Kasher Hindlin
2023	P!nk	Trustfall	"When I Get There"	—N/a
2024	Benson Boone	Fireworks & Rollerblades	"Lover Of Mine"	Steven Solomon

== Personnel ==
- 2003
  - Evanescence — Fallen (keyboards, piano, programming), string arrangement
- 2004
  - Kelly Clarkson — Breakaway (arrangement, keyboards, piano)
- 2011
  - Christina Perri — Lovestrong (additional production, background vocals, percussion, piano, programming, shaker, vocal arrangement, vocals)
