= Bad Girl (Avril Lavigne song) =

Song by Avril Lavigne featuring Marilyn Manson

from the album Avril Lavigne
- Recorded: 2013
- Studio: Henson, Hollywood
- Genre: Nu metal; pop
- Length: 2:56
- Label: Epic
- Songwriters: Avril Lavigne; Chad Kroeger; David Hodges
- Producers: Chad Kroeger; David Hodges

"Bad Girl" is a song by Canadian singer Avril Lavigne for her fifth studio album, Avril Lavigne (2013). It was written by Lavigne, Chad Kroeger and David Hodges, while the song was produced by Kroeger and Hodges and features guest vocals by American singer Marilyn Manson. After hearing "Bad Girl", Lavigne thought Manson would complement the track. Manson added his vocals to the song early one morning, and Lavigne was honored to be able to collaborate with him.

A nu metal and pop song with industrial rock, glam rock, and 1970s punk rock elements, "Bad Girl" is about BDSM and erotic asphyxiation. Critics felt it was a departure from Lavigne's previous work. Upon its release, "Bad Girl" received mostly mixed reviews; some critics complimented its energy while others found it nightmarish or disgusting. The song charted at 58 on the South Korean's Gaon Chart and at number 88 on Billboard's Canadian Hot 100. Lavigne performed "Bad Girl" during the Avril Lavigne Tour.

== Background ==
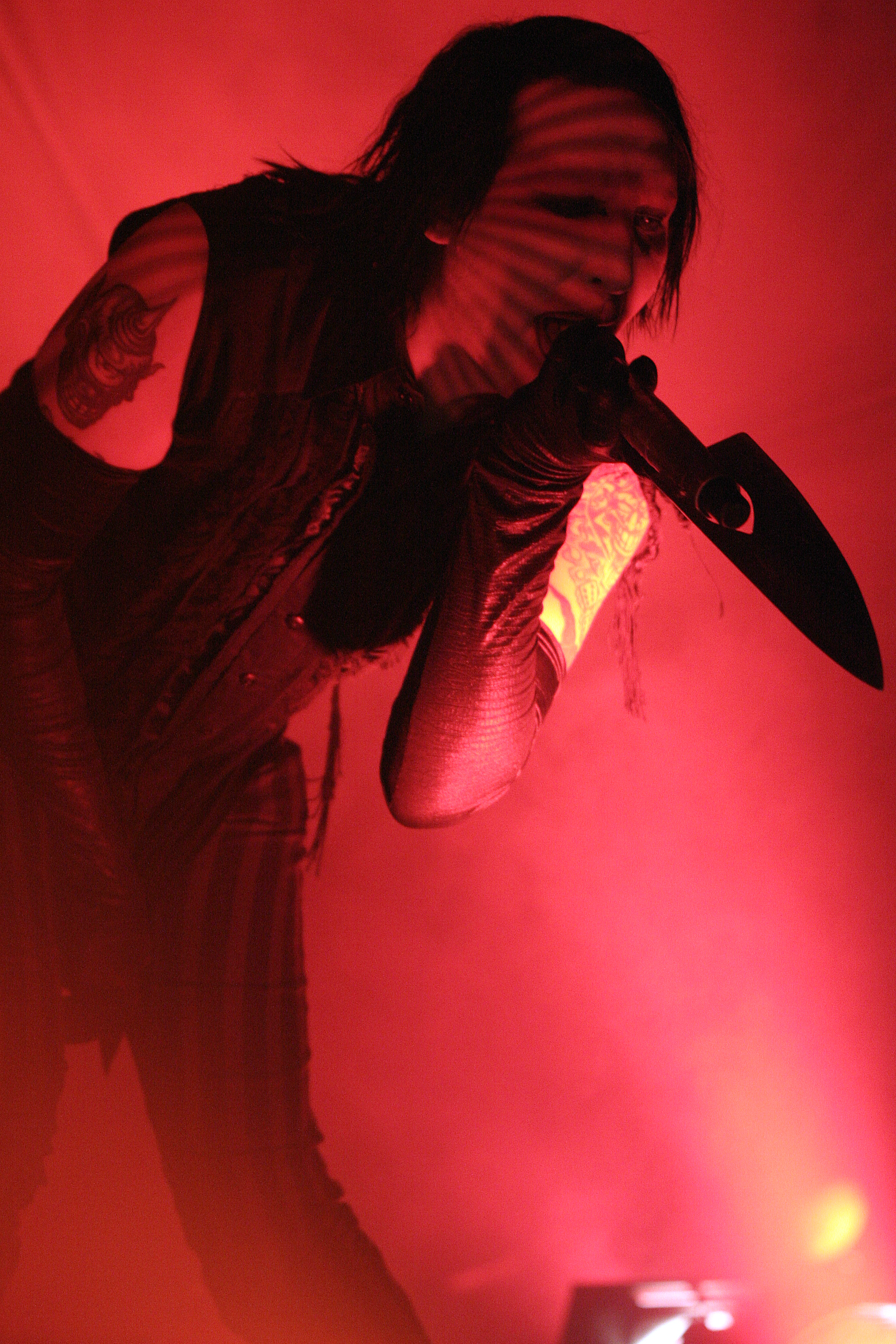
"Bad Girl" features vocals by Marilyn Manson.

When she was 18 years old, Avril Lavigne met American singer Marilyn Manson at one of his concerts, and eventually they became friends. Lavigne has cited "This Is the New Shit" (2004), a song by Manson's band, as an influence on her music. On July 7, 2012, it was reported that Lavigne was dating Manson, with the latter denying the rumor, joking that he would never date a Canadian. He continued, "I know her. I accidentally shaved her head," adding that he was unsure how the rumor originated. Lavigne commented that, "I had wanted to shave the side of my head for quite some time, [...] and so it was kind of like shaving it. And then one night, it was on my adventure to France. During my adventure when I was living there, we were hanging out backstage and we were with his band having a few drinks and I was like, 'Let's shave my head. I'm ready; let's do this!'. He's like that, though. He has fun. He wears his make-up; his wardrobe is very visual. I like his style."

In an interview with Billboard, Lavigne described "Bad Girl" as one of the "darker and heavier" rock songs on her self-titled album. Lavigne also revealed that recruiting Manson for the track "was last minute." Lavigne was listening to the track with David Hodges when she decided that Manson would be perfect for it. She texted him at four o'clock in the morning asking him to lend his vocals to the song. Lavigne commented "It was meant to be. Things are never that easy when you're trying to get together with someone. He could have been anywhere in the world." Upon his arrival at the Henson Recording Studios in Los Angeles about a half hour later, Manson played Lavigne some of his new songs. Then Lavigne played Manson some of her new songs, including "Give You What You Like" (2013), which he loved, and "Bad Girl". The moment Manson heard "Bad Girl", he knew what he wanted to add to the track. The singer was honored to be able to work with Manson and was pleased with his vocal performance on the track; she told MTV News that "Bad Girl" is one of her favorite songs on the Avril Lavigne album.

== Composition ==
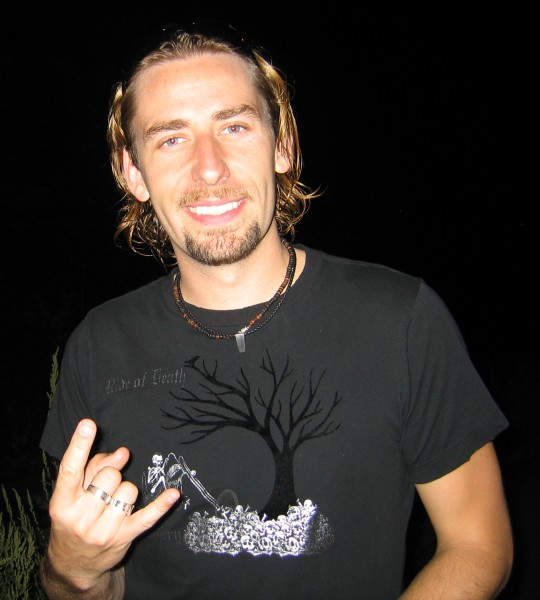
Chad Kroeger of Nickelback co-wrote "Bad Girl".

"Bad Girl" was written by Lavigne, Chad Kroeger and David Hodges, with production being handled by Kroeger and Hodges. The song features guest vocals by American industrial rock singer Marilyn Manson. "Bad Girl" is a nu metal and pop song which features elements of industrial rock, glam rock, and 1970s punk rock. "Bad Girl" begins with Manson saying "Just lay your head in daddy's lap, you're a bad girl." Nick Catucci of Entertainment Weekly compared Manson's "croaking" vocals on the song to Cookie Monster's speaking voice. The song has "crunching guitars" and is about BDSM, with Lavigne asking Manson to choke her. Lavigne sings "I've been a bad girl, don't you know?/Come get it now or never/I'll let you do whatever" and "Miss me. Miss me. Now you wanna kiss me." At different points in the song, Lavigne purrs and screams.

Laurence Green of musicOMH wrote that "Bad Girl" "sounds like the soundtrack to that bit in every corny teen movie where the good girl decides it's time to 'let loose' and hit the town." Noting that the song was co-written by Nickelback's frontman Kroeger, AllMusic's Stephen Thomas Erlewine felt that "Bad Girl" is one of several tracks on its parent album which has the "blunt force hooks and bad taste" of a Nickelback song. Conversely, Jon Caramanica of The New York Times felt that Kroeger's impact on the track, and most of the Avril Lavigne album, is "negligible." Tiffany Bentley of Metal Insider connected the song's lyrics to the rumors that Lavigne and Manson were romantically involved. Bentley also found the track more similar to the music of Manson's band than Lavigne's bubblegum pop music, and "edgier" than most of Lavigne's previous work. Idolator's Mike Wass said that while Lavigne's previous singles "Here's to Never Growing Up" (2013) and "Rock n Roll" (2013) covered "old ground," "Bad Girl" saw her leaving her musical comfort zone. Similarly, Jon Caramanica of The New York Times felt that Lavigne "revolt[s] in small ways" with "Bad Girl".

== Critical reception ==
"Bad Girl" has received mixed reviews from music critics. Jason Lipshut of Billboard named it "salacious, sloppy, muddied rock music - as it damn well should be," praising Lavigne and Manson for turning the song into "glorious chaos." Nick Catucci from Entertainment Weekly enjoyed the track's hooks and Lavigne and Manson's energetic vocals. Robert Copsey of Digital Spy praised the song's punk rock elements and for "offering an indication of where her sound could be [or] go in the future." Lauren Green of musicOMH called it "a riotous, pumping guitar work-out." Bradley Stern of MuuMuse declared that the song is "a manic, unapologetically smutty track." Metal Insider's Tiffany Bentley was shocked by Lavigne's choice to collaborate with Manson, but felt that "Bad Girl" had some of Manson's "black magic." Mike Wass of Idolator said "It's great to hear that pop's original bad girl still nows [sic] how to push boundaries and rock the fuck out." For The Guardian, Caroline Sullivan lauded the "particularly pungent" song for "raging against the dying of the light," while The Denver Post called it one of the album's "pop anthems."

Kyle Fowley of Slant Magazine felt that "Bad Girl" lacked the honesty of Lavigne's single "Complicated" (2002), calling it a "dull piece of nü-metal, featuring a phoned-in performance by a disinterested Marilyn Manson." Chuck Eddy of Rolling Stone deemed it cartoonish and devoid of the playful spirit of "Hello Kitty" (2013), another song on Lavigne's self-titled album. AllMusic's Stephen Thomas Erlewine found "Bad Girl" disgusting, partially because it was co-written by Kroeger, Lavigne's then-husband. In The News & Advance, Matt Ashare opined that Manson added nothing but clichés to the "stupidly creepy" track.

== Live performances ==
During the Avril Lavigne Tour, Lavigne performed "Bad Girl" in a medley with Marilyn Manson's "The Beautiful People" (1996).

== Credits and personnel ==
Personnel

- Avril Lavigne – Backing vocals, lead vocals, songwriting
- Chad Kroeger – Songwriting, production, guitar
- David Hodges – Songwriting, production, programming
- Marilyn Manson – Guest vocals
- Chad Copelin – Programming, bass
- Steven Miller – Guitar
- Justin Glasco – Drums
- Chris Lord-Alge – Mixing

Credits adapted from the liner notes of Avril Lavigne (2013), Epic Records.

== Chart performance ==
Along with many other songs from the parent album, "Bad Girl" debuted at number 58 on the Gaon Music Charts, with 4,511 copies sold in its first week.

Chart (2013)	Peak position
Canada (Canadian Hot 100)	88
South Korea (International Downloads Chart)	58
