= The Avril Lavigne Tour =

2013–14 concert tour by Avril Lavigne

- Tour by Avril Lavigne
- Promotional poster for the tour
- Location: Asia; North America; South America
- Associated album: Avril Lavigne
- Start date: December 1, 2013
- End date: August 19, 2014
- Legs: 4
- No. of shows: 51

Avril Lavigne concert chronology
- Black Star Tour (2011–2012); The Avril Lavigne Tour (2013–2014); Head Above Water Tour (2019)

The Avril Lavigne Tour was the fifth concert tour by Canadian recording artist Avril Lavigne. The tour was supporting her fifth studio album, Avril Lavigne (2013). Beginning December 2013, the tour played 51 concerts in North America, South America and Asia, ending in August 2014 at the Zepp concert hall in Sapporo, Japan.

In the United States, Lavigne served as opening act for the Backstreet Boys' In a World Like This Tour.

== Opening acts ==
- Patent Pending (Huntington)
- This Is All Now (Huntington)

== Set list ==
The following set list was obtained from the May 13, 2014 concert, held at Arena Monterrey in Monterrey, Mexico. It does not represent all concerts for the duration of the tour.

1. "Hello Kitty"
2. "Girlfriend"
3. "Rock N Roll"
4. "Here's to Never Growing Up"
5. "Smile"
6. "My Happy Ending"
7. "Don't Tell Me"
8. "I Always Get What I Want"
9. "I'm with You"
10. "Bad Girl" (contains elements of "The Beautiful People")
11. "He Wasn't"
12. "Sk8er Boi"

Encore

13. "Song 2"
14. "What the Hell"
15. "Complicated"

== Tour dates ==
List of 2013 concerts
| Date | City | Country | Venue |
|---|---|---|---|
| December 1, 2013^{[A]} | Hidalgo | United States | State Farm Arena |
| December 3, 2013 | New York City | United States | Highline Ballroom |
| December 4, 2013^{[B]} | Philadelphia | United States | Wells Fargo Center |
| December 5, 2013^{[C]} | Wilkes-Barre | United States | Mohegan Sun Arena at Casey Plaza |
| December 8, 2013^{[D]} | St. Charles | United States | Family Arena |
| December 9, 2013^{[B]} | Chicago | United States | United Center |
| December 10, 2013^{[E]} | Pittsburgh | United States | Petersen Events Center |
| December 11, 2013 | Huntington | United States | Paramount Theater |
| December 13, 2013^{[F]} | Towson | United States | SECU Arena |
| December 14, 2013^{[G]} | Wallingford | United States | Toyota Oakdale Theatre |
| December 16, 2013^{[H]} | Duluth | United States | The Arena at Gwinnett Center |
| December 18, 2013^{[I]} | North Charleston | United States | North Charleston Coliseum |
| December 20, 2013^{[B]} | Sunrise | United States | BB&T Center |

List of 2014 concerts
| Date | City | Country | Venue |
|---|---|---|---|
| January 31, 2014 | Osaka | Japan | Zepp Namba |
| February 1, 2014 | Tokyo | Japan | Studio Coast |
| February 3, 2014 | Yokohama | Japan | National Convention Hall |
| February 4, 2014 | Tokyo | Japan | Nippon Budokan |
| February 5, 2014 | Tokyo | Japan | Nippon Budokan |
| February 7, 2014 | Nagoya | Japan | Nippon Gaishi Hall |
| February 8, 2014 | Osaka | Japan | Intex Hall 5 |
| February 11, 2014 | Bangkok | Thailand | Impact Arena |
| February 13, 2014 | Chek Lap Kok | Hong Kong | AsiaWorld–Arena |
| February 15, 2014 | Kallang | Singapore | Singapore Indoor Stadium |
| February 17, 2014 | Quezon City | Philippines | Smart Araneta Coliseum |
| February 19, 2014 | Seoul | South Korea | Olympic Hall |
| February 21, 2014 | Shanghai | China | Mercedes-Benz Arena |
| February 23, 2014 | Guangzhou | China | Guangzhou Gymnasium |
| February 25, 2014 | Wuhan | China | Optics Valley Gymnasium |
| February 28, 2014 | Nanjing | China | Nanjing Olympic Sports Center Gymnasium |
| March 2, 2014 | Beijing | China | MasterCard Center |
| March 4, 2014 | Hangzhou | China | Yellow Dragon Gymnasium |
| March 7, 2014 | Chengdu | China | Sichuan Gymnasium |
| March 9, 2014 | Shenzhen | China | Shenzhen Bay Sports Center |
| March 12, 2014 | Jakarta | Indonesia | Istora Senayan |
| March 14, 2014 | Kuala Lumpur | Malaysia | Stadium Merdeka |
| March 16, 2014 | Taipei | Taiwan | NTSU Arena |
| April 29, 2014 | São Paulo | Brazil | Citibank Hall |
| April 30, 2014 | São Paulo | Brazil | Citibank Hall |
| May 2, 2014 | Rio de Janeiro | Brazil | Citibank Hall |
| May 3, 2014 | Belo Horizonte | Brazil | Chevrolet Hall |
| May 4, 2014 | Brasília | Brazil | NET Live |
| May 7, 2014 | Buenos Aires | Argentina | Estadio Cubierto Malvinas Argentinas |
| May 9, 2014 | Santiago | Chile | Movistar Arena |
| May 13, 2014 | Monterrey | Mexico | Arena Monterrey |
| May 14, 2014 | Zapopan | Mexico | Auditorio Telmex |
| May 15, 2014 | Mexico City | Mexico | Arena Ciudad de México |
| June 24, 2014 | Orillia | Canada | Casino Rama |
| June 25, 2014 | Northfield | United States | Hard Rock Live |
| June 27, 2014 | Atlantic City | United States | Borgata Events Center |
| June 28, 2014 | Mashantucket | United States | MGM Grand Theater |
| August 13, 2014 | Nagoya | Japan | Zepp Nagoya |
| August 14, 2014 | Fukuoka | Japan | Zepp Fukuoka |
| August 16, 2014^{[J]} | Osaka | Japan | Maishima Sports Island |
| August 17, 2014^{[J]} | Chiba | Japan | QVC Marine Field |
| August 19, 2014 | Sapporo | Japan | Zepp Sapporo |

Festivals and other miscellaneous performances
^{A} MixMas
^{B} Jingle Ball
^{C} Let It Show
^{D} Mistletoe Show
^{E} O Starry Night
^{F} Mistletoe Meltdown
^{G} All Star Christmas
^{H} Jingle Jam
^{I} Jingle Bell Ball
^{J} Summer Sonic Festival

=== Box office score data ===
| Venue | City | Tickets sold / Available | Gross revenue |
|---|---|---|---|
| Paramount Theater | Huntington | 1,555 / 1,555 (100%) | $76,960 |
| Citibank Hall | São Paulo | 10,111 / 13,152 (77%) | $739,322 |
| Citibank Hall | Rio de Janeiro | 5,069 / 7,970 (64%) | $377,111 |
| Chevrolet Hall | Belo Horizonte | 3,816 / 4,537 (84%) | $238,389 |
| Estadio Cubierto Malvinas Argentinas | Buenos Aires | 5,843 / 7,500 (78%) | $380,885 |
| Movistar Arena | Santiago | 4,083 / 11,298 (36%) | $319,106 |
| Auditorio Telmex | Zapopan | 5,144 / 8,101 (63%) | $257,017 |
| TOTAL | | 35,621 / 54,113 (66%) | $2,388,790 |
