= Give You What You Like =

Single by Avril Lavigne

from the album Avril Lavigne
- Released: March 30, 2015
- Recorded: 2013
- Studio: Henson Recording Studios (Los Angeles, CA)
- Genre: Folk-pop
- Length: 3:45
- Label: Epic
- Songwriters: Avril Lavigne; Chad Kroeger; David Hodges
- Producers: Chad Kroeger; David Hodges

Avril Lavigne singles chronology
"Hello Kitty" (2014)	"Give You What You Like" (2015)	"Fly" (2015)

Music video
- "Give You What You Like" on YouTube

"Give You What You Like" is a song recorded by Canadian singer-songwriter Avril Lavigne from her self-titled fifth studio album released in 2013. It was written by Lavigne with her then husband Chad Kroeger and David Hodges. The song has been praised by critics for expanding Lavigne's musical diversity and exposing her to new genres of music and is the sixth track on the album. Musically, "Give You What You Like" is a folk-pop song.

On 30 March 2014, Lavigne confirmed that "Give You What You Like" would be released as the album's fifth single. It would be released exclusively to North America and Europe, while "Hello Kitty" was released as the album's fourth single exclusively to Asia. After nearly one year, Lavigne posted the song's single artwork on Twitter and confirmed that it would be featured in the Lifetime TV movie Babysitter's Black Book. The song was released to the radio by Epic Records on 30 March 2015 as the album's fifth single.

== Background ==
Prior to the album's release, snippets of three of the album's tracks were posted online for a short time by Lavigne's record label: "Let Me Go", "Sippin' On Sunshine", and "Give You What You Like". Upon the album's release, Lavigne revealed on Twitter that "Give You What You Like" was one of her favorite songs from the album, and she is considering releasing it as the fourth single from the album, with the other option being "Hello Kitty". She told Idolator that "Give You What You Like", along with "Hello Kitty", "Bad Girl", and "Hush Hush", were her favorite songs from the album. The song has been described as "sexual" by many of its critics and listeners, with many agreeing that the new sound Lavigne has on this song in particular shows a very dark and mature side of her. Lavigne later confirmed that she was hungover when she recorded the song, "One day I was hungover, tired, vulnerable, and didn't want to sing, but he (Chad Kroeger) made me go in on 'Give You What You Like,' and do it anyway. The rawness of my vocals comes across in the song, which made it better. I'd have to do harmonies sometimes, and I'd start whining, and he'd want me to do 10 takes of vocals."

== Critical reception ==
"Give You What You Like" garnered critical acclaim from critics, who complimented the mature sound that Lavigne showed on the song and praised its equally matured themes. Jason Lipshutz of Billboard wrote that "the bright-eyed innocence of '17' and 'Bitchin' Summer' has vanished on 'Give You What You Like'". He further called it "a harrowing glimpse inside the exchange of physical pleasures to combat loneliness" but criticized the song's production. He ended his review by comparing Lavigne's vocals in the song to those of her 2002 hit, "I'm with You".

Allan Raible of ABC News also praised the song, writing, "As the tempos slow down, things get less juvenile and slightly more interesting. 'Give You What You Like' begins with the words, 'Please wrap your drunken arms around me.' (At last, darker material!) This is a rather sleazy song, but it is way more interesting than the shallow stabs at teen pop. At least there is some sort of grit. It's not just a middle finger (referencing the album's opening track, "Rock n Roll")."

Lavigne in the video with her brother Matt.

Sam Lansky of Idolator called the middle of the album (including "Give You What You Like") "less-effective", but praised "Let Me Go" and "Give You What You Like", writing that while "Let Me Go" was the superior track, "Give You What You Like" is "a fantastically eerie paean to a miserable one-night stand."

== Music video ==
A trailer of "Give You What You Like" was first released on Lavigne's official Vevo on 2 February 2015 at a total length of thirty seconds. The full music video was released on her official Vevo on 10 February 2015. The music video includes footage from the Lifetime TV movie Babysitter's Black Book, which was released on February 21, 2015.

== Credits and personnel ==
Credits and personnel are adapted from the Avril Lavigne album liner notes.

- Avril Lavigne – vocals, writer, background vocals, percussion
- Chad Kroeger – writer, producer, percussion
- David Hodges – writer, producer, background vocals, acoustic guitars, piano, keyboards, programming
- Chad Copelin – bass, programming, recording
- Steven Miller – guitars
- Justin Glasco – drums
- Kyle Stevens – recording assistant
- Peter Mack – recording assistant
- Chris Lord-Alge – mixing
- Keith Armstrong – mixing assistant
- Nik Karpen – mixing assistant
- Brad Townsend – additional engineering assistant
- Andrew Schubert – additional engineering assistant
- Tom Coyne – mastering

== Chart ==
Chart (2013)	Peak position
South Korea (Gaon International Chart)	55
