= More than This =

More than This may refer to:

== Songs ==
- "More than This" (Roxy Music song), 1982
- "More than This" (One Direction song), 2011
- "More than This (Peter Gabriel song), 2002
- "More than This", a song by the Cure from the 1998 soundtrack The X-Files: The Album
- "More than This", a song by Vanessa Carlton from the 2007 album Heroes & Thieves
- "More than This", a song by Robbie Williams from the 2022 album XXV (Robbie Williams album)

== Albums ==
- More than This (compilation album), a 1995 compilation album by Bryan Ferry and Roxy Music
- More than This, a 2011 album by Trading Yesterday, later The Age of Information
- More than This, a 2024 live album by CeCe Winans

== Other uses ==
- More than This (TV series), a 2022 Australian TV series
- More than This (novel), a 2013 young-adult novel by Patrick Ness
