= Herman Sinitzyn =

American actor

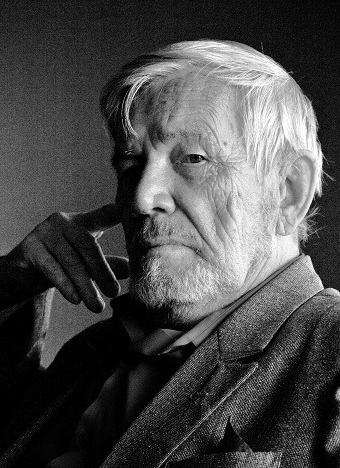
- Born: Herman Yegorovich Sinitsyn (Герман Егорович Синицын); 1 February 1940; Chișinău, Kingdom of Romania
- Died: 25 June 2016 (aged 76); Los Angeles, California, U.S.
- Occupation: Actor
- Years active: 1990–2016

Herman Sinitzyn (Russian: Герман Синицын; 1 February 1940, Chișinău – 25 June 2016, Los Angeles) was a Russian-American actor

== Biography ==
Herman Sinitsyn was born in Chișinău in 1940. After moving with his family to Leningrad, he served in the army and entered the Leningrad State University on the faculty of foreign languages. For a long time he worked as a translator. The first steps in the acting profession Herman did back in the years of service in the army.

Arriving in the United States, he continued to work as a translator. His first film role was in The Hunt for Red October, where he played a midshipman.

He was divorced and had a daughter.

== Filmography ==
- 1990: The Hunt for Red October as Seaman #5 on Red October
- 1994: Love Affair as Russian Waiter
- 1995: ER (Episode: Everything Old Is New Again) as Uncle Michel
- 1996: 2090 as Victor
- 1998: Team Knight Rider (Episode: Home Away from Home) as KGB Officer Markov
- 2003: Russians in the City of Angels (Episode: Semya)
- 2004: Alias (Episode: The Frame) as Petr Berezovsky
- 2008: General Hospital as Russian Priest
- 2008: Tsunami Beach Club as Dr. Peankov
- 2012: Joseph as Jacob
- 2013: Zoochosis (Episode: Case 04: Magic) as Sailor
- 2013: Cleaver Family Reunion as Elderly Man
- 2013: The Eric Andre Show (TV Series)
- 2014: Esther (TV Movie) as Hadar
- 2015: A Night at Christmas (TV Movie) as Balthazar
- 2017: Merrily as Kliment

Music video

- Avril Lavigne: Let Me Go
- Katy Perry: The One That Got Away
