= Hello Kitty (song) =

2013 single by Avril Lavigne

Single by Avril Lavigne

from the album Avril Lavigne
- Released: May 23, 2014
- Recorded: 2013
- Studio: Henson (Los Angeles); Conway (Los Angeles); The Lodge (Los Angeles)
- Genre: J-pop; dubstep; EDM; electro-pop
- Length: 3:18
- Label: Epic
- Songwriters: Avril Lavigne; Max Martin; Shellback; Martin Johnson
- Producer: Max Martin

Avril Lavigne singles chronology
"Let Me Go" (2013)	"Hello Kitty" (2014)	"Give You What You Like" (2015)

Music video
- "Hello Kitty" on YouTube

"Hello Kitty" is a song by Canadian singer-songwriter Avril Lavigne, taken from her self-titled fifth studio album (2013). It was written by Lavigne, Chad Kroeger, David Hodges and Max Martin. Production was handled by Kroeger and Hodges, with additional production by Brandon Paddock and Kyle Moorman. Musically, "Hello Kitty" is a J-pop, dubstep, and EDM song, featuring an electro-influenced drop. The song was influenced by Lavigne's affinity to the Japanese brand Hello Kitty, and has some sexual content.

The song was released as a Japan-only fourth single. It was mostly panned by Western music critics, who criticized its sound and called it immature, although it was generally well-received in Japan. Lavigne shot a music video for the track in Japan which was released on April 21, 2012. Due to the video's popularity, the song charted at number 75 on the Billboard Hot 100 chart, becoming the second highest charting single from the album.

== Background ==
Three months after the release of Goodbye Lullaby (2011), Lavigne announced that work on her fifth studio album had already begun, having eight songs written. Lavigne stated that the album would musically be the opposite of Goodbye Lullaby, with a release date rumoured for sometime in 2012. Lavigne explained, "Goodbye Lullaby was more mellow, [but] the next one will be pop and more fun again. I already have a song that I know is going to be a single, I just need to re-record it!." In an interview, Lavigne said about her collaboration with Kroeger: "I have a song called Hello Kitty, which I wrote about Hello Kitty because I'm obsessed, and it's a really fun thing that I've never done before. It kind of has a kind of glitchy, electronic feel to it and it's... the only one on the record that sounds like that. It's really different and a lot of my friends I've played it for really like it. I'm having a lot of fun with that one."

== Composition ==
"Hello Kitty"
A 19 second sample of "Hello Kitty", displaying elements of dubstep

"Hello Kitty" is a J-pop, dubstep, and EDM track that is three minutes and eighteen seconds long. "Hello Kitty" was written by Lavigne, Chad Kroeger, David Hodges and Martin Johnson, while the song was produced by Kroeger and Hodges. Brandon Paddock and Kyle Moorman became assistants in its production. The song was engineered by John Hanes, musical mixed by Serban Ghenea and additional programming was held by Paddock and Moorman. Lavigne described the lyrics while talking to Digital Spy, "'Hello Kitty' was such an interesting topic and subject [...] It was really exciting for me. I didn't want it to sound like anything I'd done before. I wanted it to sound over the top so I ended up hiring a new producer to help me with it."

The opening line of the song Min'na saikō arigatō, K-k-k-kawaii, k-k-k-kawaii (みんな最高 ありがとう, か か か かわいい, か か か かわいい), is a reference to the Japanese Kawaii culture. Kawaii is Japanese for "cute", and the word is popularly used to describe endearing physical characterizations in Manga and Japanese video games. She was later asked about the double meaning of the song, on account of the interchangeability of the sexual euphemisms 'kitty' and 'pussy', to which she responded, "Obviously it's flirtatious and somewhat sexual, but it's genuinely about my love for Hello Kitty as well." Additionally, she said at MuchMusic Awards, "It's really fun [and] it's about a slumber party and loving the kitty."

== Critical reception ==
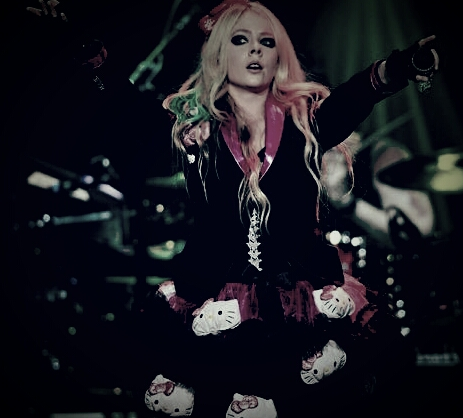
Lavigne performing ′′Hello Kitty′′ during The Avril Lavigne Tour.

Despite being well received in Japan, "Hello Kitty" was generally panned by Western music critics. While labeling it "weird", Nick Catucci from Entertainment Weekly called it "a dubstep track that seems to acknowledge its own tokenism by adopting a 'J-Pop American Funtime Now!' sheen." Despite praising her "techno-pop" influence, Jason Lipshutz of Billboard felt that "it's a bold stab at a genre outside of Lavigne's oeuvre, but it never comes together. By the 20th time 'Hello Kitty, you're so pretty' is declared, the listener's attention is already on the next track." Stephen Thomas Erlewine of AllMusic wrote that the song "bypasses bubblegum so it can settle into the embarrassing". While reviewing and stating that most of the album was "soggy", Chuck Eddy from Rolling Stone felt that "Hello Kitty" was the most playful song on the album and called it "J-pop-via-Kesha". Robert Corpsey from Digital Spy was mixed on his opinion of the song, writing that "the juddering electro-pop beats of 'Hello Kitty' serve as an ode to her you-know-what as well as her sizeable Japanese fanbase. As a curveball, it works brilliantly; but as an attempt to make her sound current in today's EDM-pop dominated charts, it falls considerably short."

Craig Manning of AbsolutePunk called it "the biggest leap of faith," describing it as "a trippy patchwork of EDM and pop that pays loving tribute to Lavigne's sizable Japanese following." Bradley Stern of MuuMuse named it "an off-the-walls EDM-infused stomper, where Lavigne conjures Gwen Stefani's bouncy, Japanese-minded Love. Angel. Music. Baby." Laurence Green from musicOMH called it a "trashy EDM moment; laced with snatches of Japanese lingo," pointing out that it "feels like a weird misstep more suited to a Britney Spears album than the predominantly rock-centric sounds present on the rest of the record." A reviewer from Sputnikmusic remarked that "Hello Kitty" is "laughably bad" and "insipid", and criticized Lavigne's attempt at trying to draw in a younger crowd. Gregory Hicks from The Michigan Daily gave the song a negative review, referring to it as an "obligatory 2013-dubstep mess created for the sole purpose of attempting to follow a trend."

== Chart performance ==
"Hello Kitty" debuted at number 84 on the Gaon International Digital Chart with 4,038 copies sold in its first week. It also spent one week on the Billboard Hot 100, at number 75, due to the popularity of the video, where 73 of the 92 percent of its chart points were attributed to Vevo on YouTube views, according to Nielsen BDS. It became her second-highest charted song from her self-titled album; "Here's to Never Growing Up", peaked at number 20 in June. It also became her highest debut on Streaming Songs to date, as the track debuted at number 14 (besting "Here's to Never Growing Up", which opened at number 26 in May following its official video debut). The song also surged to 5,000 downloads sold in the tracking week ending Sunday April 27, up from a negligible number the week before, according to Nielsen SoundScan. On the Japanese Hot Top Airplay chart, "Hello Kitty" debuted at number 82 for the week ending of May 12, 2014.

== Music video ==
The music video for "Hello Kitty" was filmed in Tokyo, Japan, and premiered on Lavigne's official website on April 21, 2014. It was widely reported that the video was removed from her YouTube channel amid criticism and controversy. However, a spokesperson for Lavigne stated that the song's video was never officially released to YouTube and was stated to go live on April 23, and removals of the video from YouTube were merely unofficial uploads following its original premiere on Lavigne's website. The video officially went live on YouTube as planned on April 23, 2014.

=== Synopsis ===
The majority of the "Hello Kitty" music video finds Avril Lavigne parading around with four identically dressed Japanese women behind her, performing dance moves, in locales like a bedroom, a candy store and a street. The video also shows Lavigne playing guitar, wearing glasses, eating sushi, waving at admirers and fans and taking a single photograph, wearing gloves that are paired with pastel hair extensions and a pink tutu covered in three-dimensional cupcakes.

=== Reception and criticism ===
A scene depicting Japanese culture from the music video, which was widely criticized and deemed as "racist" by Western critics on Twitter, but received generally favorable Twitter reactions in Japan.

The video was heavily derided by Western critics. Jason Lipshutz of Billboard panned it as "even more abhorrent than the song." While saying that the album's previous videos were "excellent", he also said that the "Hello Kitty" video "tries to do nothing. Its laziness is demonstrated in the first 21 seconds, during which Lavigne holds a plush stack of cupcakes, shakes her hips, stares at the cupcakes, bounces her shoulders, and then, when she sings the line 'Someone chuck a cupcake at me'... tosses the fake cupcakes at the camera, her lip movement not matching up to the backing track whatsoever." Alexa Camp of Slant Magazine called it "truly eyebrow-raising, taking cultural mis-appropriation to cringe-inducing levels." The Independent suggested that "'Hello Kitty' will make your eyes and ears bleed".

Its depiction of Japanese culture was met with widespread criticism from Western critics. This included suggestions of racism, which Lavigne responded to by stating: "I love Japanese culture and I spend half of my time in Japan. I flew to Tokyo to shoot this video...specifically for my Japanese fans, WITH my Japanese label, Japanese choreographers AND a Japanese director IN Japan." Nobuyuki Hayashi, a Tokyo-based tech and social media expert, commented that most of the reactions on Twitter were favorable, adding: “the people who are blaming the artist for racism are non-Japanese... but most Japanese people are not taking it that seriously.” Hiro Ugaya, a Tokyo-based journalist and media commentator, assumed that "images of cultures outside of one's own in mass media are always different from the reality. [...] When you're trying to reach the majority of consumers, images tend to be lowest common dominator [sic]".

== Live performances ==
Lavigne included "Hello Kitty" on her The Avril Lavigne Tour (2013–14) as the opening track. An instrumental version of "Hello Kitty" was used as an interlude on the Head Above Water Tour (2019).

== Credits and personnel ==
- Lead vocals by Avril Lavigne
- Written by Avril Lavigne
- Electric guitar by Martin Johnson
- Engineered by John Hanes
- Mixed by Serban Ghenea
- Produced by Martin Johnson
- Additional production and programming by Brandon Paddock, Kyle Moorman
- Additional vocal production by Chad Kroeger, David Hodges
- Recorded by Brandon Paddock, Kyle Moorman, Martin Johnson

Credits Adapted from the liner notes of Avril Lavigne (2013).

== Charts ==
Chart (2013–2014)	Peak position
Japan Hot Top Airplay (Billboard)	82
South Korea International (Gaon)	84
US Billboard Hot 100	75

== Awards ==
Year	Awards ceremony	Award	Results
2016	VEVOCertified Awards	100,000,000 views	Won
