= Avril Lavigne (album) =

Studio album by Avril Lavigne
- Released: November 1, 2013
- Recorded: November 2011 – July 2013
- Studios: Henson Recording Studios, Conway Recording Studios, The Lodge and Sleepwalker Studios (Los Angeles): NightBird Recording Studios (Hollywood); P.S Studio (Stockholm); and Casa de la Vida Studios (Cabo San Lucas)
- Genres: Pop rock; dance-pop
- Length: 46:06
- Label: Epic
- Producers: Chris Baseford; David Hodges; Rickard B Göransson; Martin Johnson; Chad Kroeger; Kyle Moorman; Brandon Paddock; Matt Squire; Peter Svensson

Avril Lavigne chronology
Goodbye Lullaby (2011)	Avril Lavigne (2013)	Head Above Water (2019)

Singles from Avril Lavigne
- 1. "Here's to Never Growing Up" Released: April 9, 2013; 2. "Rock n Roll" Released: August 23, 2013; 3. "Let Me Go" Released: October 11, 2013; 4. "Hello Kitty" Released: May 23, 2014; 5. "Give You What You Like" Released: March 30, 2015

Avril Lavigne is the fifth studio album by Canadian singer-songwriter Avril Lavigne. It was released on November 1, 2013, through Epic Records in North America and Sony Music Entertainment worldwide. Lavigne collaborated with numerous producers including Martin Johnson, Peter Svensson, David Hodges, Matt Squire, and Chad Kroeger. In both musical and lyrical aspects, the album represents a departure from the acoustic-oriented production of her previous album Goodbye Lullaby (2011), featuring a more uptempo pop sound juxtaposed with power and piano ballads. Avril Lavigne also incorporates electronic music, industrial and punk rock. The album features two vocal collaborations: Kroeger and American industrial metal singer Marilyn Manson, making Avril Lavigne Lavigne's first album to contain featured vocalists. The album marks her first sole release through Epic Records.

Avril Lavigne received mixed reviews from music critics, with many criticizing its "rebellious" attitude in some tracks, calling it forced and unnatural, with others praised its carefree, feel-good vibe. The album debuted at number five on the Billboard 200, selling 44,000 copies in its first week, this became her fifth consecutive top-five album on the chart. It also peaked at number two in Japan, selling 47,873 copies in its first week, the highest opening for the album in a particular country. Worldwide, the album impacted moderately on the charts, reaching the top-ten in over twelve countries, while peaking at number one in China and Taiwan.

Five singles were released from Avril Lavigne worldwide. "Here's to Never Growing Up" was released as the lead single in April 2013 and was an international success, reaching number one on the Taiwan and Philippines charts, while reaching the top ten in China, Ireland, Japan, and Russia among others. The second, "Rock n Roll", had less impact, while the third, "Let Me Go", performed well internationally, reaching the top 20 in Czech Republic, South Korea, and Canada. Lavigne also generated publicity with a controversial music video for the Japan-only fourth single "Hello Kitty". To further promote the album, Lavigne embarked on her fifth concert tour, The Avril Lavigne Tour.

== Background, development and release ==
Three months after the release of Goodbye Lullaby, Lavigne announced that work on her fifth studio album had already begun, with eight songs written so far. Lavigne stated that the album would musically be the opposite of Goodbye Lullaby, with a release date rumored for sometime in 2012. Lavigne explained, "Goodbye Lullaby was more mellow, [but] the next one will be pop and more fun again. I already have a song that I know is going to be a single, I just need to re-record it!" In late 2011, Lavigne confirmed that she had moved to Epic Records, which is now headed by L.A. Reid, who signed Lavigne to Arista Records in 2000. In August 2012, it was reported that Lavigne had completed work on the album, stating on her Twitter, "That's a wrap boyz @hodgesmusic and chad @Nickelback !!! Woo hoo. Super stoked for this record."

In September 2012, Epic Records chairman L.A. Reid told Billboard that Lavigne "just completed" the album and that she enlisted her then-fiancée Chad Kroeger for a song. "She worked with Chad Kroeger, who is now her fiance, and they did a really good record," says Reid. He also revealed, "We're in the mixing process now and I expect to release it very soon. I'd like to get it out this year, but time seems to be flying. If we don't, it will be top of the new year." The same month, French website Charts in France announced that the album would be released in March, however, in April 2013, the singer announced that she was still working on the album, stating, "I've been working on this record for a year, so it's been quite a while," she said. "As soon as I played [producer LA Reid] the song, he wanted to put it out right away. So I'm actually still in the studio - I'm still making my record. I still have one more song left to write that I'm going to do by myself, because I love to do that. It's important for me. But it's just - it's all happened so fast, and I'm so excited."

On August 8, 2013, Lavigne announced that the album would be a self-titled released and also revealed the cover art for the album via her Instagram account. The cover features a closeup of her face against an all-black background, with her eyes ringed in smeared eyeliner, while her hair is pulled back tight on her head. In an interview on Extra in September 2013, Lavigne said of the artwork: "I like it because I always wear my hair down, so I put my hair up and it's a little more fashion, I guess. I went nuts with the eye make-up, just a ton of black eye oil." In an interview at the radio station WRVE, Lavigne confirmed that the album would be available to pre-order on September 24, 2013, and would be released later on November 5, 2013. The official track listing was later revealed on September 5, while the entire album streamed on iTunes and her official website on October 29.

== Recording ==
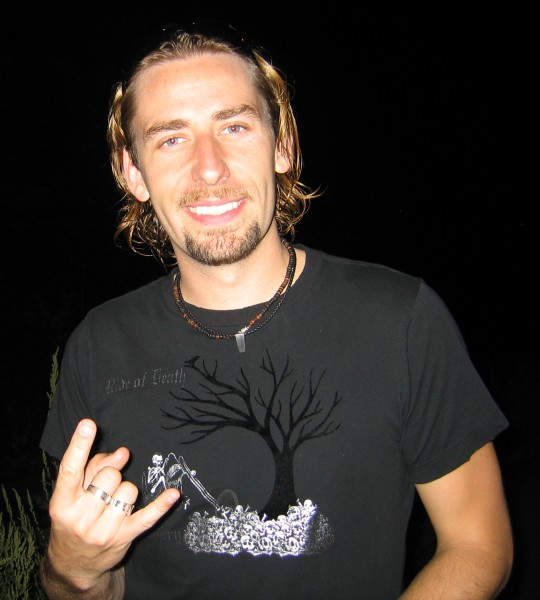
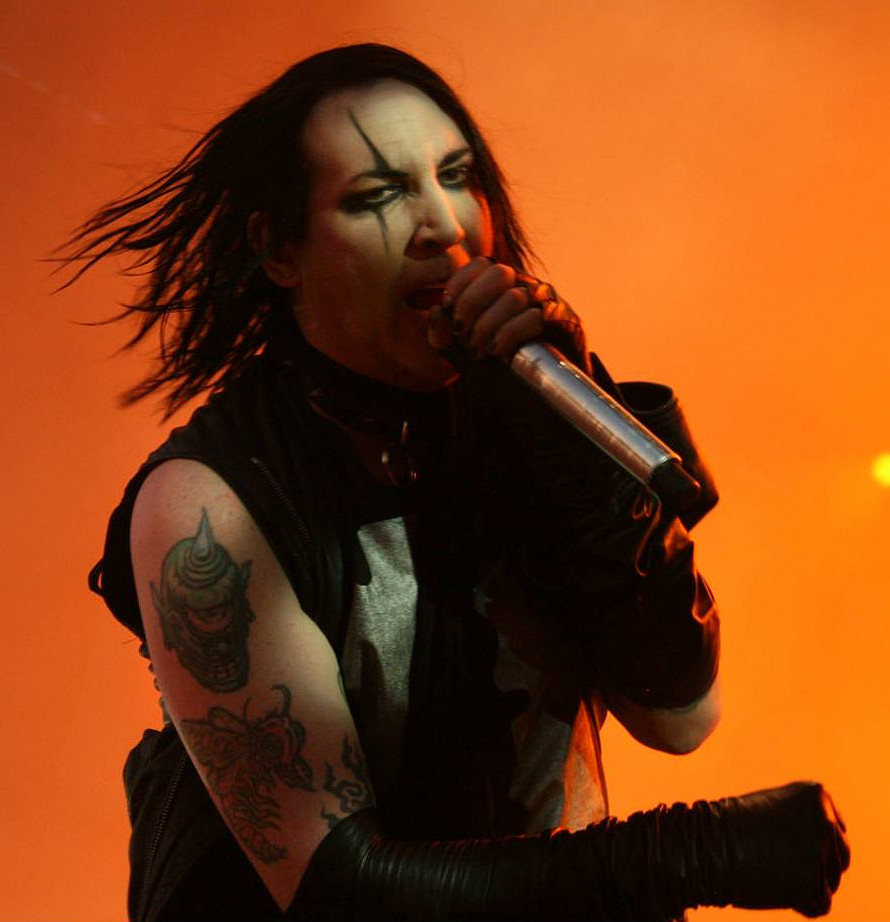
The album features Lavigne's ex husband Chad Kroeger (left) and her friend Marilyn Manson (right).

Recording sessions began in November 2011, and took place over a period of almost two years, concluding in July 2013. One of the first confirmed producers and writers for the album was Nickelback's frontman Chad Kroeger. The first song they wrote was "Let Me Go", a breakup ballad. "We started off [in March 2012] just getting to know each other, and then we really bonded through music," Lavigne said. Eventually, Lavigne and Kroeger became romantically involved in July 2012, and a month later they got engaged. Kroeger co-wrote 10 songs on the album, being the producer of three, and co-producer of four. They promised power ballads, piano ballads, string arrangements and a duet. Lavigne also worked with Evanescence former member David Hodges, commenting, "I’ve just spent 17 days working with Chad Kroeger and David Hodges. And the three of us have been writing a lot of songs together. A lot. And recording and having a really good time, having a really great time. They’re very talented musicians and it feels good for me to be around people like that."

Boys Like Girls frontman Martin Johnson also worked with Lavigne on the album, co-producing five songs, including the lead-single "Here's to Never Growing Up". In a Billboard interview, Lavigne revealed that she worked with Marilyn Manson on a track called "Bad Girl". She said about the collaboration, "It's a heavier tune and I thought his voice would be perfect on it, so I hit him up. I called him and he came over to the studio and he really liked the track and he just put some vocals down on it. He was a pro and he did an amazing job. I really appreciate him as an artist and I love his style and I really respect him and his art, and I thought it was really cool to have him on this record."

In an interview for 4Music, Lavigne teased a female collaboration, but it didn't make to the album. Because Lavigne had written so many songs for her fifth album, she was considering releasing two back-to-back albums. This is the second time that Lavigne has mentioned writing enough material for more than one record, the first during the production of Goodbye Lullaby. "I kinda wanna do the back-to-back records because I've worked so hard on writing a ton of songs and I just wanna make it perfect. And then because there were so many it was like, 'OK well what makes sense?'," she commented.

== Composition and themes ==
"We've got these pop-rock tunes, and then these piano ballads with orchestras. I have a heavier song that Marilyn Manson's on called 'Bad Girl,' and then I've got a song called 'Hello Kitty' that sounds like nothing I've done before. 'Here's to Never Growing Up' is one of the rock tunes on it, but it's all over the place."

— Lavigne talking about the album's diversity.

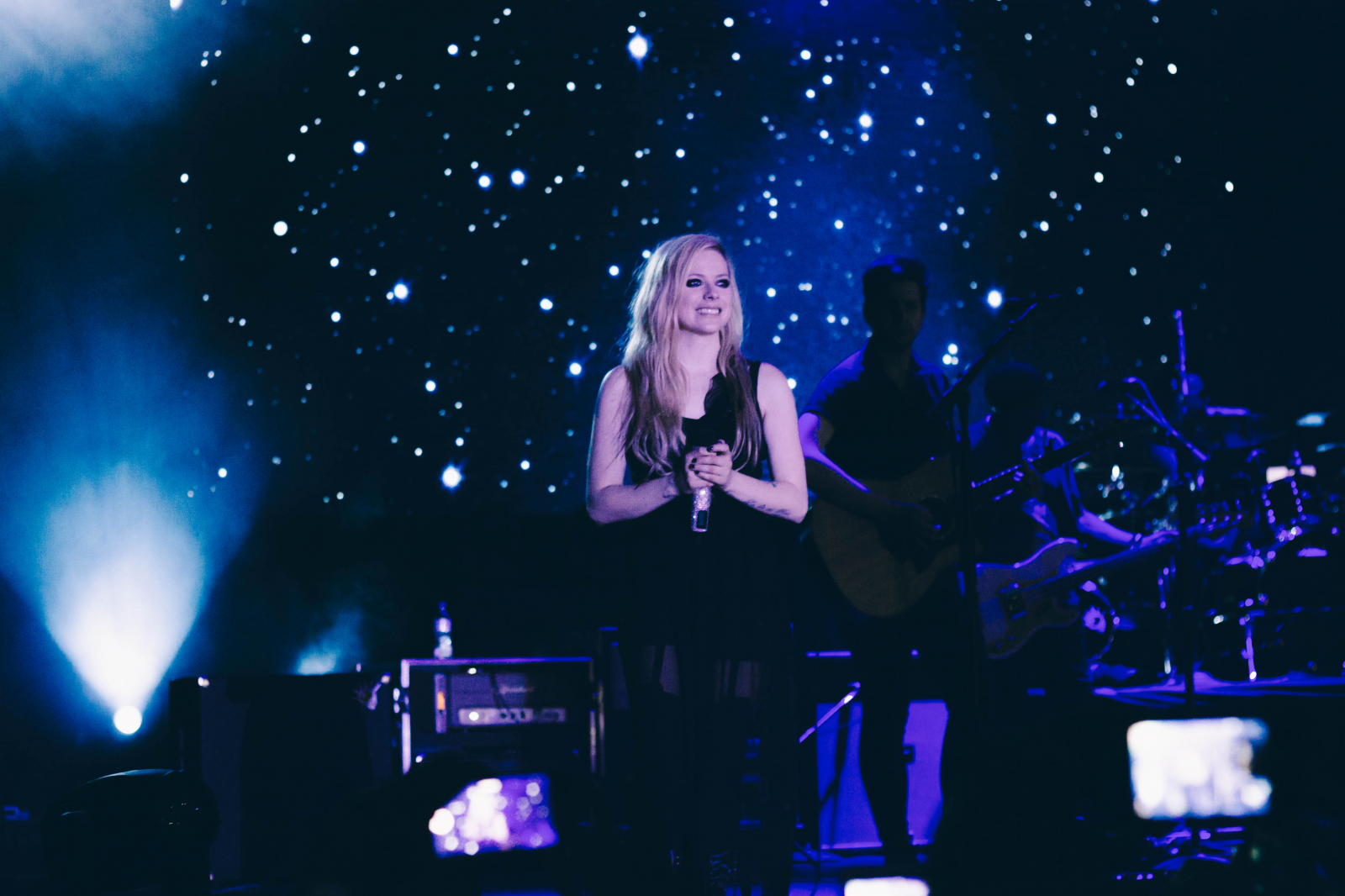
Lavigne in Brasilia 2014.

In an interview for Nylon, Lavigne stated that the album was "more artistic" than her previous efforts, explaining, "This time it's not just all songs about relationships and dudes. I just wanted to write songs and make something that was a little more artistic. I wanted to go down that road, I wasn't trying to write a big radio record." While discussing the album's style for Entertainmentwise, Lavigne opined, "The album is really all over the place. There's piano songs which are just piano and vocals, some very raw, emotional pieces. There's a few summer songs, it's nostalgic." Regarding the album's lyrical meaning, she commented, "Lyrically I pushed myself to talk about different subjects I haven't talked about before. I didn't want to be so simple. I tried to really express myself and go deeper." [...] "There's a bunch of summer songs then a couple of songs which are pretty nostalgic, about looking back like ‘17’. I guess I didn't mean for it to turn out like that but it's good."

While discussing the songs on the album, Lavigne revealed, "I'm really excited about the song 'Hello Kitty' that I've written for this record, because I'm obsessed with Hello Kitty and it's really fun and the sound is different," she said. "It sounds like nothing I've done before, and I even throw a little bit of Japanese in it." She also described the song called "Rock n Roll" as "LOUD, impressive and it stands for so many other things than just music – that's really what it comes down to - and it's a song that I’m just putting the final touches to now." She also called her duet with Marilyn Manson as "heavier" and "rock". While responding what was her favourite song on the album, Lavigne answered, "'Give You What You Like,' 'Hush Hush' and 'Bad Girl.'"

=== Songs ===
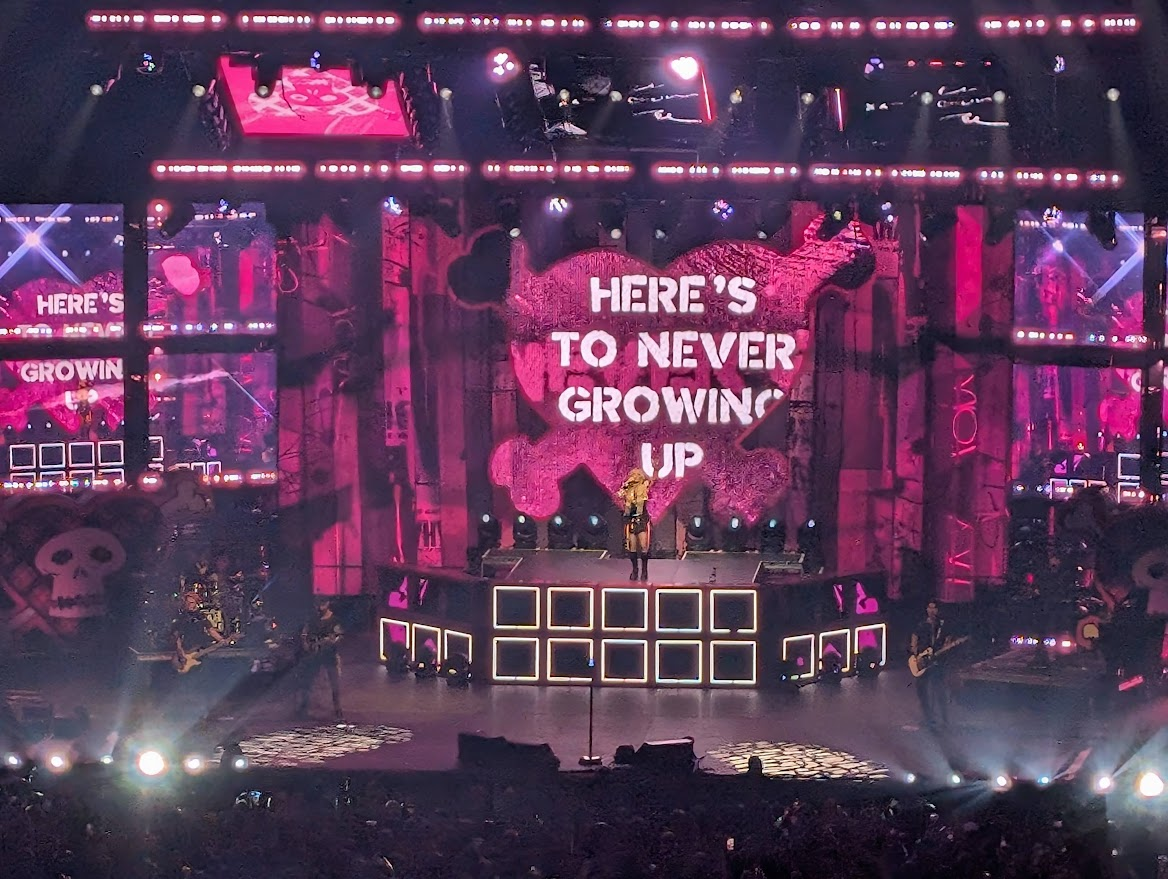
Avril Lavigne at Canada Life Place in 2025 during her performance of Here's to Never Growing up.

The album's opening track "Rock n Roll" is an upbeat, pop punk song, about a boisterous declaration of rebellion on which Lavigne puts up her "middle finger to the sky" to "let 'em know that we're still rock and roll." The second track and lead single, "Here's to Never Growing Up", is a celebration of being forever young. The third track "17" was considered a "fizzy, buzzing look back on adolescence," over a "steady" beat, "long acoustic" strums and "yelping" vocals that refract the mischievous glow of youth. It also stays the course, recalling her high school days of "learning how to break the rules". The fourth track, "Bitchin' Summer", is a mid-tempo song where she and the object of her affection are like "high school lovebirds" and she's picking him up at the liquor store. "Let Me Go", the fifth track, is a duet with Lavigne's husband and Nickelback's frontman Chad Kroeger, and was described by Lavigne as "the journey of love through one's life, going from one stage in one love into finding the right one." The sixth track "Give You What You Like" is a sensual-sounding ballad about the exchange of physical pleasures to combat loneliness.

The seventh track "Bad Girl" finds Lavigne teaming up with Marilyn Manson in a rock, industrial and nu metal arrangement, with Manson singing about his perverted "daddy" fantasies while Lavigne invites him to "do whatever" and more. "Hello Kitty" sees Lavigne flirting with electronic music and techno pop, while also featuring a dubstep breakdown. Lyrically, Lavigne pointed out that the song "is about her love of the Japanese brand" but also has a "flirtatious" meaning. The ninth track, the pop rock "You Ain't Seen Nothin' Yet", finds its protagonist rounding "third base and headed for a home run," while the bouncy "Sippin' on Sunshine" with lyrics about the sunshine being delivered by way of a kiss. The breakup track "Hello Heartache" has a background vocal hook crawling "la-la-la" and a skittering backbeat, which amplify Lavigne's pain. The twelfth track "Falling Fast" is a country pop influenced song. The song's guardedly celebrates new love with "hushed" rock elements and "crystallized" melody, which was described by Jason Lipshutz of Billboard as "at home on a Taylor Swift album". "Hush Hush", the last track on the album's standard edition, is a piano-driven ballad which emits a rush of feelings - regret, anger, desperation, nakedness, and finally, faint hopefulness.

It has been described as of merging pop with rock. It has also been described as dance-pop.

== Promotion ==
Lavigne promoted the album with a series of live performances. First, she went to Los Angeles' famed Sunset Strip club, "the Viper Room", performing a range of tracks, including "17". On September 21, 2013, Lavigne performed on the iHeart Radio Festival, performing "Here's to Never Growing Up", "Rock n Roll" and other hits. In October 2013, Lavigne performed at "We Day 2013", which took place in Vancouver, British Columbia, Canada. She performed "Let Me Go" with Chad Kroeger, as well as "Girlfriend" and "Here's to Never Growing Up". On November 5, 2013, during the album's release day in the United States, Lavigne performed "Let Me Go" and snippets of "Girlfriend" and "Sk8er Boi". She also performed "Let Me Go" on The Katie Couric Show, on November 8, 2013 and on Conan, on November 11, 2013. On December 4, 2013, Lavigne performed on Q102's Jingle Ball, singing "Here's To Never Growing Up", "Girlfriend", "Let Me Go" and "Sk8er Boi".

=== Singles ===
On April 9, 2013, the album's lead single, "Here's to Never Growing Up", produced by Martin Johnson of the band Boys Like Girls, was released. The song received mixed reviews, but was the album's most successful single. The track peaked at number 20 on the Billboard Hot 100 in the United States, also reaching the top-twenty in Australia, Canada and the United Kingdom, while reaching the top-ten in Ireland and Japan. A lyric video featuring submitted photographs of fans "never growing up" was released onto Lavigne's official Vevo account the same day as the release of the single. The song's official music video was later released on May 9, 2013.

The second single, "Rock n Roll", premiered on Lavigne's official YouTube channel on July 18, 2013, and was released on August 27, with the music video premiering a week earlier on August 20, while the lyric video for the song, featuring fan-made videos submitted through Instagram, was released onto Lavigne's official Vevo account on August 12, 2013. The song received very limited commercial success, being a success in Japan, where it reached number five. However, it only managed to peak at number 37 in Canada, number 45 in Australia, number 68 in the United Kingdom and number 91 in the United States.

"Let Me Go" featuring Chad Kroeger was confirmed as the album's third single. It premiered on the radio station KBIG on October 7, 2013. It was officially impacted contemporary hit radio in Italy on October 11, 2013. It was later made available for purchase on iTunes along with its music video on October 15, 2013. Worldwide, "Let Me Go" was more successful than "Rock n Roll", reaching a peak of number 12 on the Canadian Hot 100 chart and the top-forty in Austria. Elsewhere, it also achieved moderate impact in the United Kingdom and the United States.

On February 27, 2014, Lavigne revealed on her Twitter page that she would be releasing two singles in two different territories. Later, she revealed that "Hello Kitty" was going to be released in Asia, shooting its music video in March 2014. Lavigne also revealed the cover art for the single and its music video was released on April 21, 2014. Its music video was heavily criticised by critics, with Billboard labelling it "abhorrent" and "lazy". Its depiction of Japanese culture was met with widespread criticism, which has included suggestions of racism, with Lavigne denying it. "Hello Kitty" debuted at number 75 on the Billboard Hot 100 chart, due to the popularity of its music video.

On March 21, 2014, Lavigne confirmed that "Give You What You Like" would be released as the album's fifth single. Almost a year later, on February 2, 2015; the official artwork for "Give You What You Like" was uploaded via Lavigne's official Twitter account along with the announcement that the song would be featured in the upcoming Lifetime film Babysitter's Black Book, which premieres on February 21, 2015. The following day, a 30-second clip of the music video, including footage from the film, was posted on Vevo. On February 10, 2015, the music video for "Give You What You Like" was released. The song was released to the radio by Epic Records on March 30, 2015, as the album's fifth single.

=== Other songs ===
The only promotional single "How You Remind Me" was released in Japan on December 11, 2012, as a digital download on the One Piece Film: Z soundtrack. It was released on December 19, 2013, as a digital download in the UK. The song was included in the Japan, Taiwan and China Tour Edition of the album as one of the bonus tracks.

=== Tour ===
To further promote the album, Lavigne embarked on her fifth concert tour, the Avril Lavigne Tour, starting in Asia, followed by South America. In the United States, Lavigne served as opening act on the Backstreet Boys tour, In a World Like This Tour.

== Critical reception ==
Professional ratings
Aggregate scores
Source	Rating
Metacritic	65/100
Review scores
Source	Rating
Absolute Punk	6/10
AllMusic	3.5/5 stars
Billboard	82/100
Digital Spy	3/5 stars
Entertainment Weekly	B+
The Guardian	3/5 stars
MusicOMH	3/5 stars
Sputnikmusic	3.5/5 stars

At Metacritic, which assigns a weighted mean rating out of 100 to reviews from mainstream critics, it received an average score of 65, based on 9 reviews indicating "Generally favorable reviews". Stephen Thomas Erlewine of AllMusic gave the album a rating of 3.5 out of 5 stars, calling it "one of Avril's livelier and better albums; it's all about the good times, no matter how temporary or illusionary they may be." Erlewine also wrote that the "hooks are stronger, better than so many of Avril's songs since her 2002 debut, Let Go." Jason Lipshutz of Billboard praised the album for "encapsulat[ing] everything worth loving about the 29-year-old's long-running artistry," highlighting that "unlike 2011's Goodbye Lullaby, which featured moments in which Lavigne sounded unsure of herself, the singer is fully in control here." Nick Catucci of Entertainment Weekly was also positive, praising Lavigne for "revealing her grown-woman wisdom," noticing that the album "reminds us that maturity sometimes means doubling down on what's expected of you." Sowing Season of Sputnikmusic wrote that the album "couldn't be a better representation of her career up to the present day. It's fun, easily digestible pop for the masses, featuring the soaring choruses and melodies that made us fall in love with her over the past ten years."

Sam Lansky of Idolator lauded the album as his "favorite pop album of the year," labeling it "the Avril-iest album of Avril's career. It's brimming with character, jagged with contradictions, deeply nostalgic, occasionally annoying, likably bratty and mostly great." Laurence Green of musicOMH praised the album, writing that "the eponymous effort goes a long way to restore the singer to her rightful place as purveyor of some of the most carefree, feelgood pop around." Craig Manning of Absolute Punk acknowledged that, "It's not going to be a new favorite album for anyone other than Avril Lavigne's most ardent admirers, but a handful of great summer mixtape songs and a few other exercises in mindless pop fun are still enough to make 'Avril Lavigne' the eponymous singer's best record in nine years." Caroline Sullivan of The Guardian echoed the same thought, calling the "bratty nostalgia trip", "the best thing she's done in years." In a more negative review, Chuck Eddy of Rolling Stone found that the album features "soggy ballads, sometimes vaguely goth or R&B, and tries in vain to keep up with Taylor Swift," but praised "Hello Kitty" for feeling "truly playful." Kyle Fowle of Slant Magazine also found the exploration of life-affirming mantras and boasts of rebelliousness "forced, as if she's trying to capture an attitude, and craft a persona, that she no longer lives."

=== Accolades ===
Award	Year	Category	Result	Ref.
Juno Awards	2015	Pop Album of the Year	Nominated	
RTHK International Pop Poll Awards	2014	The Best Selling English Album	Won	
World Music Awards	2014	World's Best Album	Nominated	

== Commercial performance ==
Avril Lavigne debuted at number four on the Billboard Canadian Albums chart, selling 8,500 copies, becoming Lavigne's fifth straight top 5 album. The album was certified Platinum in MC Canada with 80,000 units sold. In the United States, the album debuted at number five, with sales of 44,000 copies. It also heralded her lowest peak and first-week sales on the chart until her sixth studio album Head Above Water in 2019. In its second week, the album dropped from number 5 to number 26. As of September 2015, the album has sold 156,000 pure copies in the United States and received a Gold certification from RIAA with 500,000 units sold in the US.

In Japan, the album debuted at number-two, shifting 47,873 copies in its first week, becoming the second album by Lavigne to peak in this position, the other being Goodbye Lullaby (2011). As of 2014, the album has sold over 210,000 copies in Japan. In the United Kingdom, the album debuted and peaked at number 14 with a little over 9,000 units sold, becoming her first album to enter and peak outside the top 10 within the United Kingdom, leaving the charts after one week. As of September 2015, Avril Lavigne sold 50,000 copies, becoming the least successful album by Lavigne in the United Kingdom. In Australia, the album debuted at number 7, selling 2,829 copies and remained on the chart for two weeks. In China and Taiwan, the album debuted at the top of the charts, eventually receiving Gold certification in China with sales of 10,000 copies. The album is the 9th best selling album of 2013 in Taiwan with sales of over 36,000 sold making Lavigne the only female western artist on the Top 10 list. Avril Lavigne self-titled album has sold 650,000 copies worldwide as of April 2014.

== Track listing ==
No.	Title	Writer(s)	Producer(s)	Length
1.	"Rock n Roll"	Avril Lavigne; Chad Kroeger; David Hodges; Peter Svensson; Rickard Göransson; J Kash	Svensson; Göransson; Martin Johnson; Kyle Moorman^{[a]}; Brandon Paddock^{[a]}	3:26
2.	"Here's to Never Growing Up"	Lavigne; Kroeger; Hodges; J Kash; Johnson	Johnson; Moorman^{[a]}; Paddock^{[a]}	3:34
3.	"17"	Lavigne; J Kash; Johnson	Johnson; Moorman^{[a]}; Paddock^{[a]}	3:24
4.	"Bitchin' Summer"	Lavigne; Kroeger; Hodges; Matt Squire; J Kash	Squire; Kroeger	3:30
5.	"Let Me Go" (featuring Chad Kroeger of Nickelback)	Lavigne; Kroeger; Hodges	Kroeger; Hodges	4:27
6.	"Give You What You Like"	Lavigne; Kroeger; Hodges	Kroeger; Hodges	3:45
7.	"Bad Girl" (featuring Marilyn Manson)	Lavigne; Kroeger; Hodges	Kroeger; Hodges	2:54
8.	"Hello Kitty"	Lavigne; Kroeger; Hodges; Johnson	Johnson; Moorman^{[a]}; Paddock^{[a]}; Hodges^{[b]}; Kroeger^{[b]}	3:16
9.	"You Ain't Seen Nothin' Yet"	Lavigne	Chris Baseford; Kroeger	3:13
10.	"Sippin' on Sunshine"	Lavigne; Kroeger; Hodges; J Kash; Johnson	Johnson; Moorman^{[a]}; Paddock^{[a]}	3:29
11.	"Hello Heartache"	Lavigne; Hodges	Hodges	3:49
12.	"Falling Fast"	Lavigne	Hodges	3:13
13.	"Hush Hush"	Lavigne; Hodges	Hodges	3:59
Total length:				46:06

Target bonus track
No.	Title	Writer(s)	Length
14.	"Rock n Roll" (acoustic)	Lavigne; Svensson; Göransson; J Kash; Kroeger; Hodges	3:24

Japanese edition and digital expanded edition bonus tracks
No.	Title	Writer(s)	Length
15.	"Bad Reputation"	Ritchie Cordell; Joan Jett; Marty Joe Kupersmith; Kenny Laguna	2:42
16.	"How You Remind Me"	Kroeger	4:06

Special Asian tour edition bonus DVD
No.	Title	Length
1.	"Here's to Never Growing Up" (music video)	3:45
2.	"Rock n Roll" (music video)	5:01
3.	"Let Me Go" (featuring Chad Kroeger) (music video)	5:06

China tour edition bonus single
No.	Title	Length
1.	"Let Me Go" (radio edit)	3:59
2.	"Let Me Go" (main version)	4:27
3.	"Let Me Go" (instrumental)	4:27

Notes

- ^{^[a]} signifies an additional producer
- ^{^[b]} signifies a vocal producer

== Personnel ==
Credits adapted from the liner notes of Avril Lavigne.

- Keith Armstrong – assistant mixer
- Chris Baseford – additional engineer, recorder, producer, instruments
- Chris Bernard – gang vocals
- Cory Bice – assistant engineer
- Candece Campbell – A&R
- David Campbell – string arrangements
- Chad Copelin – bass, programming, recorder
- Tom Coyne – mastering
- Dan Dymtrow – management
- Şerban Ghenea – mixing
- Dan Gillan – gang vocals
- Justin Glasco – drums, percussion
- Larry Goetz – additional guitar, mandolin
- Richard B. Göransson – songwriter, producer, guitar, keyboards
- John Hanes – engineer for mix
- Jeri Heiden – art direction, design
- Justin Hergett – assistant engineer for mix
- David Hodges – songwriter, piano, gang vocals, instruments, backup vocals, producer, programming, acoustic guitars, background vocals, keys, additional vocal producer, keys
- Sam Holland – recorder
- Martin Johnson – producer, electric guitar, acoustic guitar, piano, programming, percussion, cigar box guitar, background vocals, songwriter, gang vocals, additional instrumentation, recorder
- Taylor Johnson – mandolin
- Devin Kam – gang vocals
- Nik Karpen – assistant mixer
- J Kash – songwriter, backup vocals
- Suzie Katayama – cello
- Ethan Kaufmann – acoustic guitar, electric guitars
- Chad Kroeger – songwriter, vocals, gang vocals, producer, instruments, guest vocals, acoustic guitar, electric guitars, drums, percussion, additional vocal producer
- Miguel Lara – assistant additional engineer
- Avril Lavigne – songwriter, vocals, gang vocals, guitars, background vocals, percussion, executive producer
- Adam Leber – management
- Mark Liddell – photography
- Chris Lord-Alge – mixer
- James McAlister – drums, percussion
- Peter Mack – assistant additional engineer, assistant recorder
- Marilyn Manson – guest vocals
- Max Martin – additional programming, keyboard
- Tony Maserati – mixing
- Steven Miller – guitars, mixing
- Kyle Moorman – programming, additional producer, gang vocals, recorder
- Josh Newell – additional engineer
- Dave "Rave" Ogilvie – mixing
- Brandon Paddock – programming, additional producer, gang vocals, bass, recorder
- L.A. Reid – executive producer
- Eva Reistad – assistant additional engineer
- JP Robinson – epic art direction
- Larry Rudolph – management
- Andrew Schubert – additional assistant mixer, assistant additional engineer
- SMOG Design – art direction, design
- Matt Squire – producer, instruments, backup vocals
- Gordini Sran – programming, additional engineer
- Steven Stark – cello
- Nick Steinhardt – art direction, design
- Kyle Stevens – assistant additional engineer, assistant recorder
- Peter Svensson – songwriter, producer, guitar, programming, keyboards, recorder
- Brad Townsend – additional assistant mixer, assistant additional engineer
- Eric Weaver – assistant additional engineer

== Charts ==
=== Weekly charts ===
Chart (2013–15)	Peak position
Argentinian Albums (CAPIF)	10
Australian Albums (ARIA)	7
Austrian Albums (Ö3 Austria)	9
Belgian Albums (Ultratop Flanders)	36
Belgian Albums (Ultratop Wallonia)	38
Canadian Albums (Billboard)	4
China Albums (Sino Chart)	1
Danish Albums (Hitlisten)	31
Dutch Albums (Album Top 100)	23
Finnish Albums (Suomen virallinen lista)	37
French Albums (SNEP)	30
German Albums (Offizielle Top 100)	15
Greek Albums (IFPI)	23
Hungarian Albums (MAHASZ)	31
Irish Albums (IRMA)	20
Italian Albums (FIMI)	8
Japan Hot Albums (Billboard Japan)	2
Japanese Albums (Oricon)	2
Mexican Albums (AMPROFON)	26
New Zealand Albums (RMNZ)	8
Norwegian Albums (VG-lista)	19
Polish Albums (ZPAV)	28
Russian Albums (2M)	9
Scottish Albums (Official Charts)	16
South Korean Albums (Circle)	8
South Korean International Albums (Circle)	2
Spanish Albums (Promusicae)	11
Swiss Albums (Schweizer Hitparade)	8
Swedish Albums (Sverigetopplistan)	39
Taiwan Albums (G-Music)	2
Taiwan International Albums (G-Music)	1
UK Albums (Official Charts)	14
UK Album Downloads (Official Charts)	8
US Billboard 200	5
US Digital Albums (Billboard)	4

=== Year-end charts ===
Chart (2013)	Position
Japan Hot Albums (Billboard Japan)	67
Japanese Albums (Oricon)	53
South Korea International Albums (Circle)	35
Taiwan Albums (G-Music)	9

Chart (2014)	Position
Japan Hot Albums (Billboard Japan)	80

== Certifications and sales ==
Region	Certification	Certified units/sales
Canada (Music Canada)	Platinum	80,000^{‡}
Japan (RIAJ)	Gold	100,000^{^}
Mexico (AMPROFON)	Gold	30,000^{‡}
South Korea	—	2,915
United Kingdom (BPI)	Silver	60,000^{‡}
United States (RIAA)	Gold	500,000^{‡}
Summaries
Worldwide	—	650,000
^{^} Shipments figures based on certification alone.^{‡} Sales+streaming figures based on certification alone.

== Release history ==
Country	Date	Label
Australia	November 1, 2013	Sony Music
Germany	November 1, 2013	Sony Music
United Kingdom	November 4, 2013	Columbia UK
United States	November 5, 2013	Epic
Taiwan	November 5, 2013	Sony Music Taiwan
Japan	November 6, 2013	Sony Music Japan
Thailand	November 6, 2013	Sony Music Thailand
China	December 3, 2013	Sony Music China
