= The Age of Information =

American band

- Also known as: Trading Yesterday
- Origin: Little Rock, Arkansas, U.S.
- Genres: Alternative rock; pop rock
- Years active: 2002–2007
- Labels: Epic; Sleepwalker
- Members: David Hodges; Steven McMorran; Josh Dunahoo; Will "Science" Hunt
- Past members: Mark Colbert

The Age of Information (formerly known as Trading Yesterday) was an American alternative rock band formed in 2002 by David Hodges and Mark Colbert, and later joined by Steven McMorran. In 2004, they released a demo CD titled The Beauty and the Tragedy, then they released their first single, "One Day", in 2005 after signing with Epic Records. Their album "More Than This" was shelved when their contract with Epic ended, but it was released independently in 2011 by Hodges' Sleepwalker Records.

== History ==
In 2002, Hodges and Mark Colbert began to collaborate and formed Trading Yesterday, recording music from an apartment setup. McMorran would later join the band.

In 2004, Trading Yesterday released the demo CD The Beauty and the Tragedy. They signed to Epic Records and moved to Los Angeles, California to begin work in their major label debut. In May 2005, the single "One Day" was released. However, the band parted with Epic Records on November 30 for unstated reasons, and the album's release was shelved.

After returning to independent status, the band had their demo The Beauty and the Tragedy reprinted for sale on February 25, 2006. On June 27, 2006, Colbert left Trading Yesterday to pursue a career as an audio engineer.

In 2007, the band stopped performing and writing new music under the name Trading Yesterday. Musicians Josh Dunahoo and Will "Science" Hunt joined Hodges and McMorran, and it was announced that the band would change their name from "Trading Yesterday" to "The Age of Information." An EP, Everything is Broken, was released on September 1, 2007.

== Band members ==
=== Current ===
- David Hodges — vocals, guitar and piano (2003–present)
- Josh Dunahoo — guitar (2003–present)
- Steven McMorran — bass guitar, background vocals (2003–present)
- Will "Science" Hunt — drums (2006–present)

=== Former ===
- Mark Colbert — drums (2003–2006)

== Discography ==
Albums and EPs

1. The Beauty and the Tragedy (May 15, 2004; demo CD)
2. More Than This (2006; unreleased. 2011; self-published release)
3. Everything is Broken (September 11, 2007; EP)

Singles

1. One Day (May 4, 2005)
