= Let Me Go (Avril Lavigne song) =

2013 single by Avril Lavigne

Single by Avril Lavigne featuring Chad Kroeger

from the album Avril Lavigne
- Released: October 11, 2013
- Studio: Henson Recording Studios (Los Angeles, CA); Sleepwalker Studios (Los Angeles, CA)
- Genre: Pop rock
- Length: 4:27 (album version); 3:57 (radio edit)
- Label: Epic
- Songwriters: Avril Lavigne; Chad Kroeger; David Hodges
- Producers: Chad Kroeger; David Hodges

Avril Lavigne singles chronology
"Rock n Roll" (2013)	"Let Me Go" (2013)	"Hello Kitty" (2014)

Chad Kroeger singles chronology
"Porn Star Dancing" (2010)	"Let Me Go" (2013)

Audio sample
- file; help

Music video
- "Let Me Go" on YouTube

"Let Me Go" is a song recorded by Canadian recording artists Avril Lavigne and Nickelback lead vocalist Chad Kroeger for Lavigne's fifth album, Avril Lavigne. The song was written by Lavigne, Kroeger and David Hodges, and released on October 11, 2013, by Epic Records as the album's third single. Lavigne married Kroeger in mid-2013; this was the first time she collaborated with a guest artist on a single.

Critics gave the piano-driven power ballad mixed reviews, with some calling it "a monster duet", and others criticizing Kroeger's vocals and his involvement in the track.

A music video was released on October 15, 2013, and it shows Lavigne roaming the halls of an abandoned mansion, with Kroeger's appearance being channeled through an elderly yardman, only to be seen as his true self through mirrored and tablet-assisted images. The song debuted at number 37 on the US Billboard Adult Pop Songs chart and at number 78 on Billboard Hot 100. It has also debuted and peaked at number 12 on the Canadian Hot 100, after charting in three airplay formats and debuting at number 7 on the Canadian Digital Songs chart. The music video has reached over 100 million views on Vevo as of October 2016.

== Background and release ==
"Let Me Go" was released as the third single from Lavigne's fifth album Avril Lavigne on October 15, 2013, after the release of the first two singles, "Here's to Never Growing Up" and "Rock N Roll". Lavigne described it as a piano ballad and one of her favorite songs from Avril Lavigne. "Let Me Go" features vocals from Lavigne's husband, Nickelback frontman Chad Kroeger, whom she married in July 2013. The song was first written in March 2012 and was originally going to be about letting go of someone, but after Lavigne's and Kroeger's relationship started growing, they rewrote the last chorus to reflect it.

The song premiered on October 8, 2013, at KBIG 1043 MYfm and has been released on the iTunes Store a week later on October 15, 2013.

== Composition ==
"We started off [in March 2012] just getting to know each other, and then we really bonded through music," Lavigne said. "We became really good friends and then things blossomed. The effect was very natural."

— Avril Lavigne talking about working with Chad Kroeger.

"Let Me Go" was written by Avril Lavigne, Chad Kroeger and David Hodges, with production being handled by Kroeger, who also provided guest vocals, and Hodges. It is a "piano-tinged" pop rock ballad. Carl Williott of Idolator highlighting "the most obnoxious aspects of Avril’s snotty pop and Chad’s rock-by-numbers mookery can breathe a sigh of relief." Its instrumentation features a piano, a string section, an acoustic drum kit, and electric guitars and bass. The song starts with Lavigne beginning in a relationship that's clearly past its prime, "I'm breaking free from these memories/ Gotta let it go, just let it go/ I've said goodbye, set it all on fire,". Chad's verse, "You came back to find I was gone / And that place is empty, like the hole that was left in me", brings a turn to the lyric's meanings. Now, the act of letting go of memories carries the promise of another beginning.

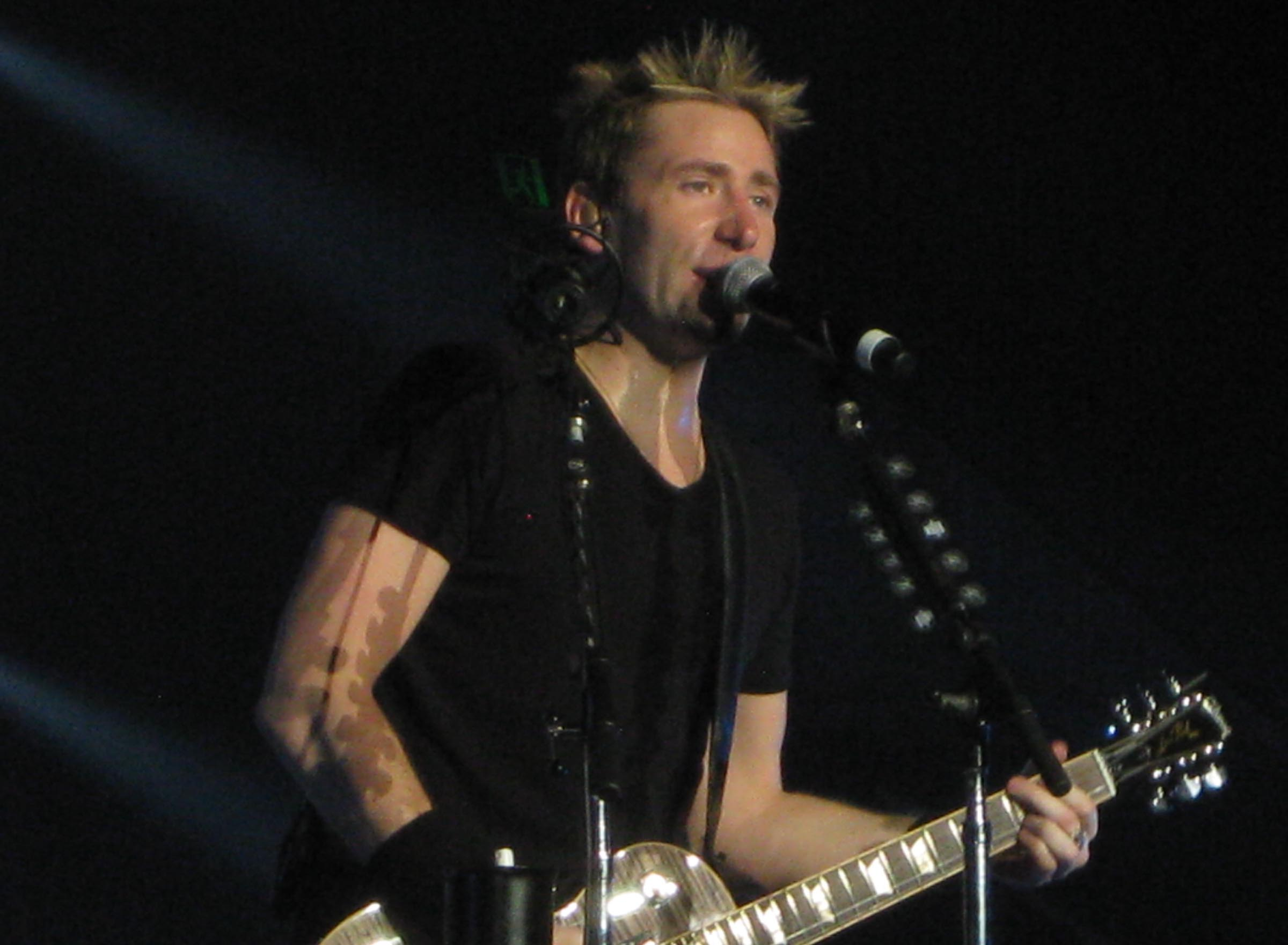
Lavigne's husband Chad Kroeger (pictured), is the co-writer, producer, and is featured on the track.

The song was written on the first day Lavigne started working with Nickelback frontman Chad Kroeger on songwriting for her fifth album. They sat with writer and producer David Hodges (ex-Evanescence) and penned "Let Me Go". Ironically, the song started out as a breakup song. "It was about letting go of someone and having them let go of you," Lavigne told Yahoo Music. After the song was finished, Kroeger and Lavigne did the very opposite of letting go: They continued to work together, and soon they discovered their chemistry was more than musical. After becoming a couple, the two continued to write and record together in the studio, with Kroeger co-writing 10 of 13 songs. But when the couple looked back at the first song they did together, "Let Me Go," they decided the lyrical theme was no longer appropriate. "After we were together we were both like, 'Okay, we're engaged and our duet together is a breakup song.'" Lavigne said. "It was kind of fucked up. So we changed it. We rewrote the last chorus to put a twist on it so we end up together. Therefore the message of the song is more the journey of love through one's life. Obviously I've been in other relationships. So it's like going from one stage in one love into finding the right one. It's kind of sweet."

== Critical reception ==
The song has received mixed reviews. Critics overall praised the lyrics and Lavigne's performance, but criticized Kroeger's vocals and his seemingly "unnecessary" appearance. Cornelius Vernon-Boase of Soundscape Magazine wrote the song "is a slower song and has a rock ballad feel with a powerful chorus," praising Chad's vocals, writing that "they add nicely to the song with his huskiness that gives it the raw powerful feeling." Vernon-Boase gave the song a positive review, considering it one of the album's stand out tracks. Nick Catucci of Entertainment Weekly called the song, "a monster duet", "which might be deeply weird because it is newlyweds singing what seems to be a breakup ballad, or might be completely unremarkable because it sounds like a Nickleback song." John Walker of MTV Buzzworthy wrote the song, "offers all the emotional guidance you may need in a fragile post-breakup state." Joseph Apodoca of On the Record Carpet wrote that the song "is reminiscent of many of Lavigne's biggest power ballad hits, including 'Losing Grip,' 'Nobody's Home' and 'Keep Holding On'." Elliot Robinson of So So Gay wrote that in "Let Me Go", is where Kroeger's musical stylings are most noticeably felt," calling "infectious yet truculent pop-rock and earnest balladeering."

While reviewing the album, Jason Lipshut of Billboard Magazine analyzed that the song "is thoroughly dramatic after four carefree tracks on the album, and while the voice don't blend perfectly, the duet is strong enough to avoid sounding forced or cobbled together." However, Dan Reilly, also from Billboard named the song to be one of the "20 best love songs by real-life couples." Nathan Jolly of The Music Network praised Lavigne's vocals, writing that, "she delivers a vocal performance that reminds us that she can belt with the best of them," while saying that Kroeger, "as usual, is so awash in effects that he sounds like an underwater Vedder-bot." Jolly continued to say that the song was a "big, brooding, Evanescence-esque power ballad will be impossible for radio programmers to ignore." Sputnikmusic's staff called the song "a ‘mandatory’ collaboration", writing that the song looks like a Nickelback song, that "could have gone a whole lot worse, but is still an overlong, overdramatic song that never needed to be created in the first place." Feminist website Jezebel, called it "as torturous as you could possibly imagine." Jamie Parmenter of Renowned for Sound was critical of the duet, because "it sounds entirely like a Chad Kroeger song, and not a very good one."

== Commercial performance ==
=== North America ===
On October 21, 2013, Billboard revealed that the song had debuted at number 37 on the Adult Pop Songs chart. It eventually peaked at number 20 on the chart. It also debuted on the Billboard Hot 100 chart at number 78, beating "Rock N Roll"'s peak position of number 91. "Let Me Go" performed better on the Canadian Hot 100 chart, becoming her best-performing single since the lead single from her fourth album Goodbye Lullaby, "What the Hell" (2011) and Lavigne's highest chart debut at number 12, which is where it peaked. It stayed in this position on the chart for three non-consecutive weeks. "Let Me Go" also debuted and peaked at number 7 on the Hot Canadian Digital Songs chart. It was eventually certified platinum in the country on April 18, 2024.

=== Europe ===
Elsewhere, "Let Me Go" charted very moderately. In Austria, the song debuted at number 63, on November 1, 2013, before re-enter three non-consecutive times, with the last time peaking at number 32, on January 31, 2014. The song became her highest charting-single since "What the Hell" (2011) and the best charting-single from the album. In the United Kingdom, "Let Me Go" managed to peak at number 66, but it was never released as single there. In France, "Let Me Go" became Lavigne's lowest-charting single of her career. Worldwide, "Let Me Go" has sold over 500,000 copies

== Music video ==
The music video for "Let Me Go" was directed by Christopher Sims and premiered on Lavigne's official channel on YouTube on October 15, 2013. It starts off showing an old man (played by Herman Sinitzyn) sweeping leaves outside a mansion, before the music kicks in. The clip shows Lavigne representing a ghost of a pianist, alone in the (presumably now empty) mansion without lighting and with covered furniture, attempting to get in touch with the man she loved. This man is revealed to be the old man from the beginning, who is played by Kroeger in flashbacks to his younger self. The two appear together during the song's final chorus.

== Track listing ==
Digital download

1. "Let Me Go" – 4:27

Taiwan CD single

1. "Let Me Go" (Radio Edit) – 3:57
2. "Let Me Go" (Main Version) – 4:27
3. "Let Me Go" (Instrumental) – 4:27

== Charts ==
Chart (2013–14)	Peak position
Australia (ARIA)	77
Austria (Ö3 Austria Top 40)	32
Belgium (Ultratip Bubbling Under Flanders)	7
Belgium (Ultratip Bubbling Under Wallonia)	16
Brazil (Billboard Brasil Hot 100)	52
Brazil Hot Pop Songs	19
Canada Hot 100 (Billboard)	12
Canada AC (Billboard)	6
Canada CHR/Top 40 (Billboard)	24
Canada Hot AC (Billboard)	12
Czech Republic Airplay (ČNS IFPI)	8
Czech Republic Singles Digital (ČNS IFPI)	94
France (SNEP)	168
Germany (GfK)	63
Netherlands (Tipparade)	13
Scottish Singles Chart	54
South Korea (Gaon International Digital Chart)	5
Switzerland (Schweizer Hitparade)	63
UK Singles (Official Charts Company)	66
US Billboard Hot 100	78
US Adult Pop Airplay (Billboard)	20

== Certifications ==
Region	Certification	Certified units/sales
Canada (Music Canada)	Platinum	80,000^{‡}
^{‡} Sales+streaming figures based on certification alone.

== Release history ==
Country	Date	Format	Label
Italy	October 11, 2013	Contemporary hit radio	Sony Music
Worldwide	October 15, 2013	Digital download	Sony Music, Epic Records
Taiwan	December 27, 2013	CD single	Sony Music

== Awards ==
Year	Award Ceremony	Award	Result	Ref.
2014	2014 World Music Awards	World's Best Song	Nominated	
2014	2014 World Music Awards	World's Best Video	Nominated	
