= David Hodges =

American musician

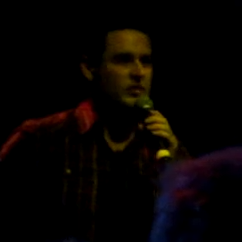
- Hodges in 2014

Background information
- Born: December 5, 1978 (age 47); Little Rock, Arkansas, U.S.
- Genres: Pop; pop rock; country
- Occupations: Songwriter; producer
- Instruments: Vocals; keyboard
- Years active: 1999–present
- Labels: Sleepwalker; Warner Brothers

David Hodges (born December 5, 1978) is an American songwriter and record producer from Little Rock, Arkansas. He was a studio contributor to the rock band Evanescence from 2000 to 2002, and has co-written and co-produced for pop, pop rock and country artists, including Kelly Clarkson, Celine Dion, Daughtry, Backstreet Boys, Avril Lavigne, David Archuleta, Christina Aguilera, Carrie Underwood, Jessie James, 5 Seconds of Summer, Christina Perri, and Tim McGraw.

== Career ==
Hodges co-wrote on Evanescence's 2000 demo CD Origin and 2003 debut album, Fallen. In 2002 in Little Rock, he co-founded with Mark Colbert a band called Trading Yesterday, which released a demo CD called The Beauty and the Tragedy on May 15, 2004. In 2004, as a credited name on Fallen, Hodges received two Grammy Awards for Best Hard Rock Performance and Best New Artist. He and former Evanescence member Ben Moody co-wrote on Kelly Clarkson's songs "Because of You" and "Addicted" from her 2004 album Breakaway. "Because of You" reached number seven on the Billboard Hot 100.

In 2004, Trading Yesterday, which was renamed The Age of Information, signed a record deal with Epic Records and moved to Los Angeles, California to work on their major label album. The single "One Day" was released on the soundtrack to the film Stealth. In 2006, they parted ways with Epic and the album, tentatively titled More Than This, was shelved; it was independently released in September 2011. Hodges co-wrote on the single "What About Now" from Daughtry's 2006 debut album.

In 2007, The Age of Information released an EP, Everything is Broken. Hodges co-wrote on Celine Dion's "This Time" and the Backstreet Boys' "Something That I Already Know". In July 2008, he signed to Warner Bros. Records as a solo artist. Under Warner, The Rising (EP) was released digitally on August 11, 2009. He co-wrote and co-produced on American Idol runner up David Archuleta's song "Crush", which reached number two on the Billboard Hot 100. Hodges took home BMI pop awards for both "Crush" and "What About Now" in 2010.

Hodges next worked with Carrie Underwood, co-writing "What Can I Say" for her third album Play On (2009), which went to No. 1 on the Country Billboard Charts. He also co-wrote the songs "Open Up Your Eyes" and "Supernatural" with Daughtry for their second album Leave this Town (2009), and Jessie James's "Wanted". In 2010, Hodges released a project with John Campbell entitled Avox. He co-wrote with Underwood and Hillary Lindsey on "There's a Place for Us", the end title song of the film The Chronicles of Narnia: The Voyage of the Dawn Treader. The song was nominated for a Golden Globe Award for best original song in a motion picture.

In 2011, Hodges released an album entitled Kings & Thieves with the band Arrows to Athens. That year, he co-wrote and co-produced on Christina Perri's debut album Lovestrong, including the singles "Arms" and "Distance" featuring Jason Mraz. Hodges co-wrote the song "Stitch by Stitch" that The Voice winner Javier Colon performed on the first season as his first single, which topped the iTunes pop charts. He also had credits on several songs from David Cook's second album This Loud Morning (2011).

Hodges and songwriting partner Steven Solomon wrote multiple songs together with Tristan Prettyman for her Capitol Records album Cedar and Gold. Hodges worked again with Perri to co-write the song "A Thousand Years" for the soundtrack of the film The Twilight Saga: Breaking Dawn – Part 1 (2011). He then co-wrote "The Woman I Love" with Mraz from his album Love is a Four Letter Word (2012).

In 2012, Hodges was one of the producers on Avril Lavigne's self-titled album, and co-wrote on multiple songs in the album including "Here's to Never Growing Up", "Rock n Roll", "Let Me Go" featuring Nickelback's Chad Kroeger, and "Hello Kitty". Hodges also began writing with Tonic frontman Emerson Hart for Hart's solo record Beauty in Disrepair. 2012 also marked the end of Hodges' seven-year publishing relationship with EMI after the company was bought by Sony/ATV. Hodges signed with Kobalt Music Group and started his own publishing joint-venture with them called Third and Verse.

In 2013, Hodges co-wrote for Carrie Underwood's single "See You Again" from her album Blown Away. The song went to No. 1 at country radio, and was certified platinum. He also co-wrote Colbie Caillat's "When The Darkness Comes", featured in the soundtrack of the film The Mortal Instruments: City of Bones (2013). In 2014, he helped write the song "Faith" with Lacey Sturm for her album Life Screams. In 2015, he co-wrote "The Girl You Think I Am" with Underwood from her album Storyteller, and "Jet Black Heart" on 5 Seconds of Summer's album Sounds Good Feels Good. Hodges has also co-written songs from Keith Urban, Gavin DeGraw, Christina Aguilera, Tim McGraw, Phillip Phillips, Blake Shelton, Dan + Shay, Hey Violet, Tonight Alive, Steven Tyler, Molly Kate Kestner, Hunter Hayes, Josh Groban, Weezer.

== Discography ==
- Musical Demonstrations Part 1 (2000)
- Trading Yesterday - The Beauty & the Tragedy (2004)
- Trading Yesterday - One Day (2005)
- The Age Of Information - Everything is Broken (2007)
- The Rising EP (2009)
- AVOX - The Fragile World (2010)
- Trading Yesterday - More Than This (2011)
- The December Sessions, Vol. 1 (2011)
- Arrows to Athens - Kings & Thieves (2011)
- Passengers: Weapons EP (2013)
- The December Sessions, Vol. 2 (2013)
- Passengers: Sirens EP (2014)
- The December Sessions, Vol. 3 (2015)
- The December Sessions, Vol. 4 (2016)
- Arrows to Athens - Exile (2016)
- The December Sessions, Vol. 5 (2017)
- Discrepancies in the Recollection of Various Principles / Side A (2019)
- Discrepancies in the Recollection of Various Principles / Side B (2019)
- Hemiispheres - Grief (2020)
- In The Round (2021)
- The Unattainable (2023)
- The Unavoidable (2023)
- The Inevitable (2025)

== Awards ==
- Grammy Awards: 2004 – Evanescence – Best Hard Rock Performance for "Bring Me to Life"; Best New Artist
- Golden Globe Award: 2010 – Carrie Underwood – "There's a Place For Us" (nomination)
