= Rock n Roll (Avril Lavigne song) =

2013 single by Avril Lavigne

Single by Avril Lavigne

from the album Avril Lavigne
- Released: August 23, 2013
- Recorded: 2013
- Studio: Henson, Los Angeles; Conway, Los Angeles; The Lodge, Los Angeles; P.S. Studio, Stockholm
- Genre: Pop-punk; alternative rock; pop rock; power pop
- Length: 3:26
- Label: Epic
- Songwriters: Avril Lavigne; Peter Svensson; Rickard B Goransson; JKash; Chad Kroeger; David Hodges
- Producers: Peter Svensson; Rickard B Goransson; Martin Johnson

Avril Lavigne singles chronology
"Here's to Never Growing Up" (2013)	"Rock n Roll" (2013)	"Let Me Go" (2013)

Music video
- "Rock n Roll" on YouTube

"Rock n Roll" is a song by Canadian singer and songwriter Avril Lavigne. It was released as the second single from her self-titled fifth studio album by Sony Music Entertainment on August 23, 2013. The song was written by Lavigne, David Hodges, Chad Kroeger, Jacob Kasher Hindlin, Rickard B. Göransson and Peter Svensson and was produced by Peter Svensson.

"Rock n Roll" is an upbeat pop-punk song, and lyrically it is a declaration of rebellion on which the singer puts up her "middle finger to the sky" to "let 'em know that she's still rock and roll," refusing to behave like an adult. The song received critical praise from music critics, and was highlighted as one of the standout tracks on the album.

"Rock n Roll" performed moderately on the charts, reaching number one in South Korea and Taiwan, and number five in Japan, respectively. The song failed to make impact elsewhere, peaking at number 37 in Canada and number 91 on the US Billboard Hot 100 chart. The music video directed by Chris Marrs Piliero shows Lavigne in comic-book combat mode, conspiring with Danica McKellar (playing a character called Winnie Cooper) in an attempt to "save rock and roll".

== Background and release ==
After "Here's to Never Growing Up", Lavigne announced that "Rock n Roll" will be the second single from her self-titled fifth studio album, asking to her fans on her Twitter page, on 18 July 2013, to unlock the single's cover art. After her fans tweeted so much and a consistent worldwide trending topic, Lavigne released the cover art for "Rock n Roll" and gave her fans an exclusive listen to the song, uploading the full audio onto her YouTube account.

Lavigne announced via Twitter that "Rock n Roll" would be digitally released on 30 July 2013, but later announced on the day that it had been pushed back and it would be released to coincide with the song's music video. The date was later confirmed to be 27 August 2013.

== Composition and lyrics ==
"Rock n Roll" was written by Lavigne, Chad Kroeger, David Hodges, Peter Svensson, Rickard Goransson and Jacob Kasher Hindlin with production being handled by Svensson, Goransson and Martin Johnson. The song is an upbeat, pop-punk song, which according to "MTV News"'s Jocelyn Vena, "sonically and thematically, picks up where her first single, 'Here's to Never Growing Up,' left off, thanks to its sing-along chorus, rocking beat and carpe diem attitude." For Sam Lansky of Idolator, the songwriting of the song handled by Dr. Luke protege Jacob Kasher, David Hodges from Evanescence and Peter Svensson from The Cardigans, "is a funny marriage of execrable alt-rock pedigree and genius pop pedigree." Lansky also noted that the song has "a 'stomp-stomp-clap' loop that shamelessly apes Queen's 'We Will Rock You', strategically placed gang vocals and a post-chorus 'Hey!' hook so catchy it’s effectively burning holes in your brain."

Lyrically, "Rock n Roll" is a "boisterous" declaration of rebellion on which the singer puts up her "middle finger to the sky" to "let 'em know that she's still rock and roll," promising "she’ll never cover up her tattoo and revealing that she prefers her jeans ripped." "I don't care if I'm a misfit, I like it better than the hipster bulls**t," she admits on the opening of the song, over bouncy, cheerleader-esque stomps. In the chorus, Lavigne declares, "When it’s you and me, we don’t need no one to tell us who to be / We keep turning up the radio / When it’s you and I, just put up our middle finger to the sky / Let 'em know that we’re still rock n roll."

== Reception ==
=== Critical reception ===
"Rock n Roll" was universally acclaimed by music critics. Robert Copsey of Digital Spy gave the song 4 out of 5 stars, writing that "Rock n Roll" features "the best of her bratty, hook-laden rock-pop; and we're safe in the knowledge Avril wouldn't have it any other way," also writing that, "it wouldn't sound out of place on a One Direction album." In another review for Digital Spy, Copsey noted that "she yells, 'Let's get wasted!' with the same rebellious charm that feels nothing if reassuringly familiar." Sam Lansky of Idolator praised the track, writing that "it’s deliriously, thrillingly wonderful, maybe even better than 'Here's to Never Growing Up'," pointing out that, "It’s a little shouty and bratty like 'Sk8er Boi' or 'Girlfriend', and not quite as sweet as 'Growing', but with a pop chorus that's absolutely jaw-dropping and 100% sincere." Sputnikmusic staff called the song "the catchiest song on the entire album." B30 Music Reviews lauded the song, calling it "pretty spectacular", stating that the "pure gratitude" track "tears it apart on production value", however stated that the song was slightly similar to her previous single "Here's to Never Growing Up".

While reviewing the album, Jason Lipshut of Billboard wrote that the song is "as good of a lead-off track as any: bombastic, sneering but defiantly listenable, 'Rock n Roll' reveals its best details -- the chunkiness of the guitar solo, the line 'I ain't never gonna cover up that tattoo' -- in repeated listens." Elliot Robinson of So So Gay picked it as a "standout track", calling it "brilliant". Direct Lyrics gave a positive review, stating the song "rocks" and should have been picked as the album's lead single, praising the song's "epic production, cheeky lyrics" and "catchy melody", favorably comparing to her 2002 single "Sk8er Boi", however noted the song's potential lack of radio appeal. Amy Sciarretto of PopCrush gave the song 2 and a half out of 5 stars. Sciarretto called the song "overly enunciated" and "standard issue Avril", however praised the guitar solo which provided a "tougher timbre". Sciarretto concluded her review by stating Lavigne's fans would "love" the song, however that "it likely wouldn't bring her any new fans".

"Rock n Roll" was named by MTV.com as 'The Best Superhero-themed Music Video of all-time' beating Taylor Swift's 'Bad Blood' and many more.

=== Commercial performance ===
"Rock n Roll" performed modestly on the charts worldwide, not matching the success of the previous single, "Here's to Never Growing Up". In the United States, "Rock n Roll" only peaked at number 91 on Billboard Hot 100 chart, becoming her lowest charting single since "Hot" (2007), staying only one week on the charts. While in Canada, the single managed to enter the top-forty, peaking at number 37 on the Canadian Hot 100, but only stayed on the charts for two weeks. In Australia, the song debuted and peaked at number 45 on the ARIA Charts.

On the other hand, the single proved to be far more successful in East Asia, reaching the top-five in two countries. In South Korea, the single debuted at number 2, with sales 26,637, while in the next week, the song took over the number-one spot with 23,153 downloads sold. It's the fourth best-selling song by a foreign artist in September 2013 in South Korea with 46,865 downloads. In October the song fell to number eighty with 9,383 copies sold. "Rock N Roll" debuted at number 91, and rose to number 5, on the week ending 12 October 2013. The song re-entered into the charts dated on 15 November 2013, when she performed the song on a TV station in Japan, peaking at #5 on the country's official singles chart. To date, "Rock N Roll" has sold more than 500,000 copies worldwide.

=== Accolades ===
Award/Publisher	Year	Category	Result	Ref.
MTV	2013	The Best Superhero-Themed Music Video Ever	2nd place	
MTV Video Music Awards Japan	2014	Best Karaokee! Song	Nominated	
MuchMusic Video Awards	2014	International Video of the Year By A Canadian	Nominated	
MuchMusic Video Awards	2014	Your Fave Artist/Group	Nominated	

== Music video ==
=== Lyric video ===
A lyric video for "Rock n Roll" – featuring fan-made videos submitted through Instagram – was released onto Lavigne's official Vevo account on 12 August 2013. Irish duo Jedward, make a cameo in the lyric video.

=== Background and release ===
On 25 July 2013, Lavigne began shooting the music video for the song, directed by Chris Marrs Piliero. It features actress Danica McKellar, Billy Zane and Sid Wilson of the band Slipknot. According to Courtney E. Smith of Radio.com, the video "takes all kinds of ideas from the 1995 cult film Tank Girl including the comic book inspired opening credits and the punk-meets-military costuming. Avril even wears the blonde hair with pink streaks that Lori Petty sported as the titular character." Four teaser videos were released on 13, 16, 18 August, and 19 August 2013 respectively, followed by the full video on 20 August 2013. The music video was shot in Palmdale, California.

=== Synopsis ===
"It was the first kiss for both of us. We never really talked about it afterward. But I think about the events of that day again and again, and somehow I know Winnie does too"
—Lavigne talking about the kiss shared with Danica McKellar, directly quoting the voiceover from the pilot episode of The Wonder Years.

The music video opens with a promo for Sony Xperia Z1 with a reference to one of Lavigne's earliest hits "Sk8er Boi" during which the singer paraphrases the song's lyrics on the phone. As she hangs up, the phone screen shows the opening scene of the storyline, where Lavigne is dressed in camouflage, helmet and bandolier, dancing in front of a diner and a vehicle (a modified purple 1970 Dodge Challenger). The theme of the video revolves around the singer and her crew taking on the mission of "Saving Rock N Roll." An attack by bear and shark crossbreed hybrids called the "bearsharks" threatens humans and the existence of Rock N Roll. The bearshark kills off Billy Zane. In a diner, Lavigne is chatting with her friend Winnie, played by Danica McKellar. Lavigne shreds the waitress's outfit to make her look more "Rock n Roll", then she notices the bearshark in disguised form and fights him. He throws a baby doll at her, which she deflects. The bearshark gets away after distracting Lavigne and her crew with a lobster.

The scene where Lavigne and McKellar share a kiss.

After defeating the lobster, the singer, Winnie and their dog follow the bearshark. During the car chase, the drunken dog crashes into a tree, dying. After an argument between Lavigne and Winnie, they mourn the dog, and share a kiss, with a voiceover by Lavigne talking about the kiss. During the dog's funeral, Lavigne unlocks a guitar equipped with a sawblade from his casket, which she uses to play the song's guitar hook in the front yard of a church, then she uses it to slay the bearshark, who finally appears in his real form. After her victory, Lavigne gets a thumbs up from the ghost of Billy Zane, who launches vertically into the sky on a Segway. She smiles and lifts her guitar overhead. The scene turns into a drawing and the credits roll.

=== Reception ===
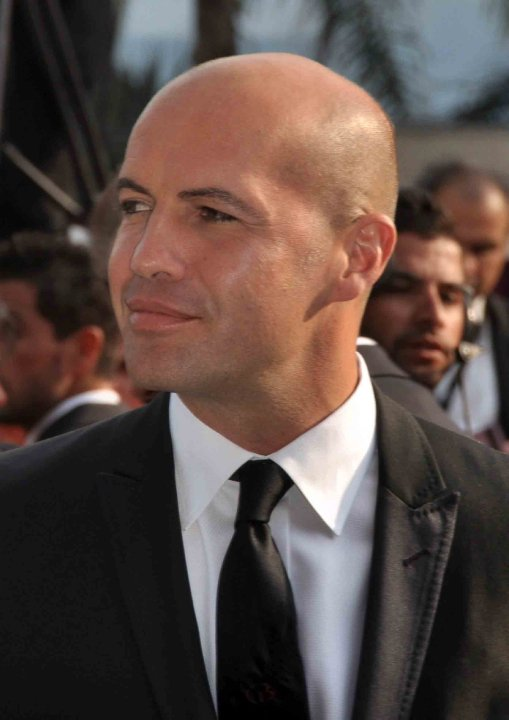
Actor Billy Zane received positive response for his cameo in the video.

The video had mixed reception from critics. Natalie Finn of E! Online wrote the video is "Part cartoon, part comedy and somewhat fierce, 'Rock N Roll' is all girls-just-want-to-have fun shenanigans." Jason Lipshut of Billboard praised the video, writing that, "The video (which takes most of its cues from the comic book world) is loud, unsubtle and utterly fantastic," writing that some of the highlights of the music video is "the post-car crash kiss with Danica McKellar, Lavigne ripping off her nemesis' mustache to reveal his true identity and of course, the oddball cameo from the 'Titanic' villain (Billy Zane)." Sam Lansky of Idolator also enjoyed the video, writing that, " It’s colorful, flashy and surprisingly funny, and it shows why Avril’s self-aware teenage brat routine is so irresistible." Bill Lamb of About.com wrote the video "is all charming, humorous, action packed fun."

Samantha Martin of Pop Dust wrote "the video is the weirdest and also the greatest", expressing that, "[...] when Avril Lavigne makes things more complicated, she ends up with a masterpiece." Nicole James of Fuse called it "a mind-boggling hodgepodge of weird moments," writing that Avril "wins this one." In a negative review, Melinda Newman of HitFix criticized the video, for "moving at a fast clip," because it "feels compelled to put in 'shocking' moments, like a really bad joke about a dog licking its balls, and a stunningly unsexy girl-on-girl kiss between Lavigne and McKellar. It is only when Lavigne is leaning up against her souped-up getaway vehicle singing or when she grabs a very cool guitar that she seems remotely in her element." Newman also wrote that, "It’s almost painful to watch her try to emote her way through her tough-girl antics." The video was highly met with positive feedback when it was able to grab 5th position on Yahoo's top 10 music videos of 2013. Similarly PopCrush also expressed the same reviews on the song claiming it to be the best music video of 2013

== Live performances ==
On 26 September 2013, Lavigne performed the song on the Jimmy Kimmel Live! to a large audience outside the studio. The performance had Lavigne dressed in a black-and-silver "pop-punk finery", while her backup dancers – and, the giant bearshark from her "Rock N Roll" video – started the set while perched on a Jeep before making their way to the stage mid-song, with "well-timed" smoke bombs punctuated the performance of the track." Lavigne also performed the song on "Extra", when she stopped by Universal Studios Hollywood to talk with Mario Lopez about her album. Lavigne performed the single on different TV shows of Japanese TV in November 2013 and February 2014.

On 30 September 2013, Lavigne performed the track on The Queen Latifah Show. Mike Wass of Idolator commented that the singer performed the song for "a less than appreciative audience," praising Lavigne, which according to her, "looked and sounded great but it was hard to watch her belt out an ode to never growing up while the crowd clapped along like church parishioners."

== Track listing ==
Digital download

1. "Rock n Roll" – 3:26

CD single (Walmart exclusive)

1. "Rock n Roll" (Album version) – 3:26
2. "Rock n Roll" (Instrumental) – 3:27

== Credits and personnel ==
Personnel

- Avril Lavigne – lead vocals, backing vocals, songwriting
- Chad Kroeger – songwriting
- David Hodges – songwriting
- Peter Svensson – songwriting, producer
- Rickard Göransson – songwriting, producer
- Jacob Kasher – songwriting
- Martin Johnson – producer
- Serban Ghenea – mixing
- Kyle Moorman – engineer
- Brandon Paddock – engineer

Credits adapted from the liner notes of Avril Lavigne (2013), Epic Records.

== Charts and certifications ==
=== Weekly charts ===
Chart (2013)	Peak position
Australia (ARIA)	45
Belgium (Ultratip Bubbling Under Flanders)	17
Belgium (Ultratip Bubbling Under Wallonia)	29
Brazil Hot 100 Airplay (Billboard Brasil)	57
Canada Hot 100 (Billboard)	37
Czech Republic Airplay (ČNS IFPI)	15
France (SNEP)	128
Italy (FIMI)	47
Japan Hot 100 (Billboard)	5
Scottish Singles Chart	51
Slovakia Airplay (ČNS IFPI)	49
South Korea (Gaon International Digital Chart)	1
Taiwan (Five Music Western Chart)	1
UK Singles Chart	68
US Billboard Hot 100	91
US Hot Singles Sales Chart (Billboard)	3

=== Year-end charts ===
Chart (2013)	Position
Japan Hot 100 (Billboard)	75
Japan Hot Top Airplay (Billboard)	36
Japan Adult Contemporary (Billboard)	27
South Korea (Gaon International Chart)	106

=== Certifications ===
Region	Certification	Certified units/sales
Japan (RIAJ) Digital single	Gold	100,000^{*}
^{*} Sales figures based on certification alone.

== Release history ==
Region	Date	Format	Label
Italy	23 August 2013	Contemporary hit radio	Sony
United States	26 August 2013	Top 40 Radio	Epic Records
United States	27 August 2013	Digital download, CD single	Epic Records
Australia	27 August 2013	Digital download	Epic Records, Sony Music
Philippines	27 August 2013	Digital download	Epic Records, Sony Music
Taiwan	27 August 2013	CD single	Sony Music
United Kingdom	27 October 2013	Digital download	Epic Records, Sony Music
