= Here's to Never Growing Up =

2013 single by Avril Lavigne

Single by Avril Lavigne

from the album Avril Lavigne
- Released: April 9, 2013
- Recorded: 2013
- Studio: The Lodge (Los Angeles, CA); Henson Recording Studios (Los Angeles, CA); Casa de la Vida Studios (Cabo San Lucas)
- Genre: Pop rock
- Length: 3:34
- Label: Epic
- Songwriters: Avril Lavigne; Martin Johnson; Chad Kroeger; David Hodges; Jacob Kasher
- Producer: Martin Johnson

Avril Lavigne singles chronology
"Push" (2012)	"Here's to Never Growing Up" (2013)	"Rock n Roll" (2013)

Music video
- "Here's to Never Growing Up" on YouTube

"Here's to Never Growing Up" is a song recorded by Canadian singer-songwriter Avril Lavigne for her self-titled fifth studio album in 2013. The song was written by Lavigne, David Hodges, Chad Kroeger, Jacob Kasher, and its producer Martin Johnson. It was released as the lead single from the album on April 9, 2013, by Epic Records. "Here's to Never Growing Up" is a midtempo pop rock song that talks about a "celebration of being forever young" and features a reference to English alternative rock band Radiohead.

Music critics provided mixed reviews to "Here's to Never Growing Up" and drew comparisons between it and songs by Katy Perry, Kesha, and Taylor Swift. The single achieved considerable success globally, reaching number one on the Taiwan and Philippines charts, while reaching the top ten in China, Ireland, Japan, Russia, Scotland, South Korea, and South Africa, also reaching the top twenty in Australia, Canada, Italy, the United Kingdom and the United States. It achieved certifications by the Australian Recording Industry Association (ARIA) the Recording Industry Association of America (RIAA).

An accompanying music video for "Here's to Never Growing Up" was directed by Robert Hales. It features Lavigne and her band performing at the school's prom, and resembles the music video for her 2002 single "Complicated". The video gained positive feedback from critics, who praised Lavigne's look in the clip. Due to the song's success, Lavigne performed "Here's To Never Growing Up" on a number of shows, including Dancing with the Stars, Today and The Voice UK. The song was playable in the video game Guitar Hero Live.

== Background ==
"When I was writing it, I was thinking about being younger – I’m still in my 20s, but you know, like high school – and with my 20s being in music and everything, I love the concept of 'simply prom' for the video".

— Lavigne talking about the song's conception to 4Music.

"Here's To Never Growing Up" was written by Lavigne, David Hodges, Chad Kroeger, Jacob Kasher, and producer of the song Martin Johnson. The song was recorded in early 2013 at Henson Recording Studios. During an interview with Ryan Seacrest for 102.7 KIIS-FM show, Lavigne said, "I wanted to write something fun and summery. It's about being young, wanting to be young forever, living in the moment and having a blast". Talking about the song's conception to 4Music, Lavigne revealed that she missed her high school prom so much, and that was the reason why she wrote "Here's To Never Growing Up". She said, "When I was writing it, I was thinking about being younger – I’m still in my 20s, but you know, like high school – and with my 20s being in music and everything, I love the concept of 'simply prom' for the video". Lavigne announced the song would be released as the first single from her fifth studio album on 8 February 2013 via Twitter. Lavigne later revealed the single's official artwork as well as its release date via Twitter on 3 April 2013. Epic Records premiered "Here's to Never Growing Up" on On Air with Ryan Seacrest (KIIS-FM) radio show, on iTunes Stores and eventually sent the single to US contemporary hit radio station on 9 April 2013.

== Composition ==
"Here's To Never Growing Up" (2013)
A 21 second sample of "Here's to Never Growing Up"'s chorus. A midtempo pop rock song, it discusses a "celebration of being forever young". Critics draw comparisons between the track and songs such as "22", "We Are Young", and "Teenage Dream".

"Here's To Never Growing Up" is a midtempo pop rock song, with a moderate tempo of 82 beats per minute. It is composed in the key of F major. Lavigne's vocal range in the track spans from the low-note of A_{3} to the high-note of C_{5}. The "punchy" song is built around a "big, kick-drum" stomp, acoustic-guitar-strumming, and simple-minded tunes. Digital Spy editor Robert Cospey wrote the song has a "pumping guitars 'n drums melody". Melinda Newman from HitFix thought that "Here's to Never Growing Up" is a "throwback" to Kesha's "Tik Tok" (2009) and Lavigne's "Girlfriend" (2007) for the same musical structure.

Lyrically, the song talks about a "celebration of being forever young". In the song, Lavigne sings about the things she's going to do that she believes will keep her forever young, such as getting drunk and dancing on a bar, running down the street screaming profanities, blasting music and staying up all night. At the beginning, Lavigne sings "Singing Radiohead at the top of our lungs", referencing the rock band Radiohead, which is also featured in the chorus. At the chorus, she continues "We'll be running down the street yelling kiss my ass", followed by an "ear-snagging chant" of "oh-woah-oh". Lavigne declares her celebration at the second verse, "This is who we are/ I don't think we'll ever change/ They say 'Just grow up,' but they don't know us/ We don't give a fuck!".

== Reception ==
=== Critical reception ===
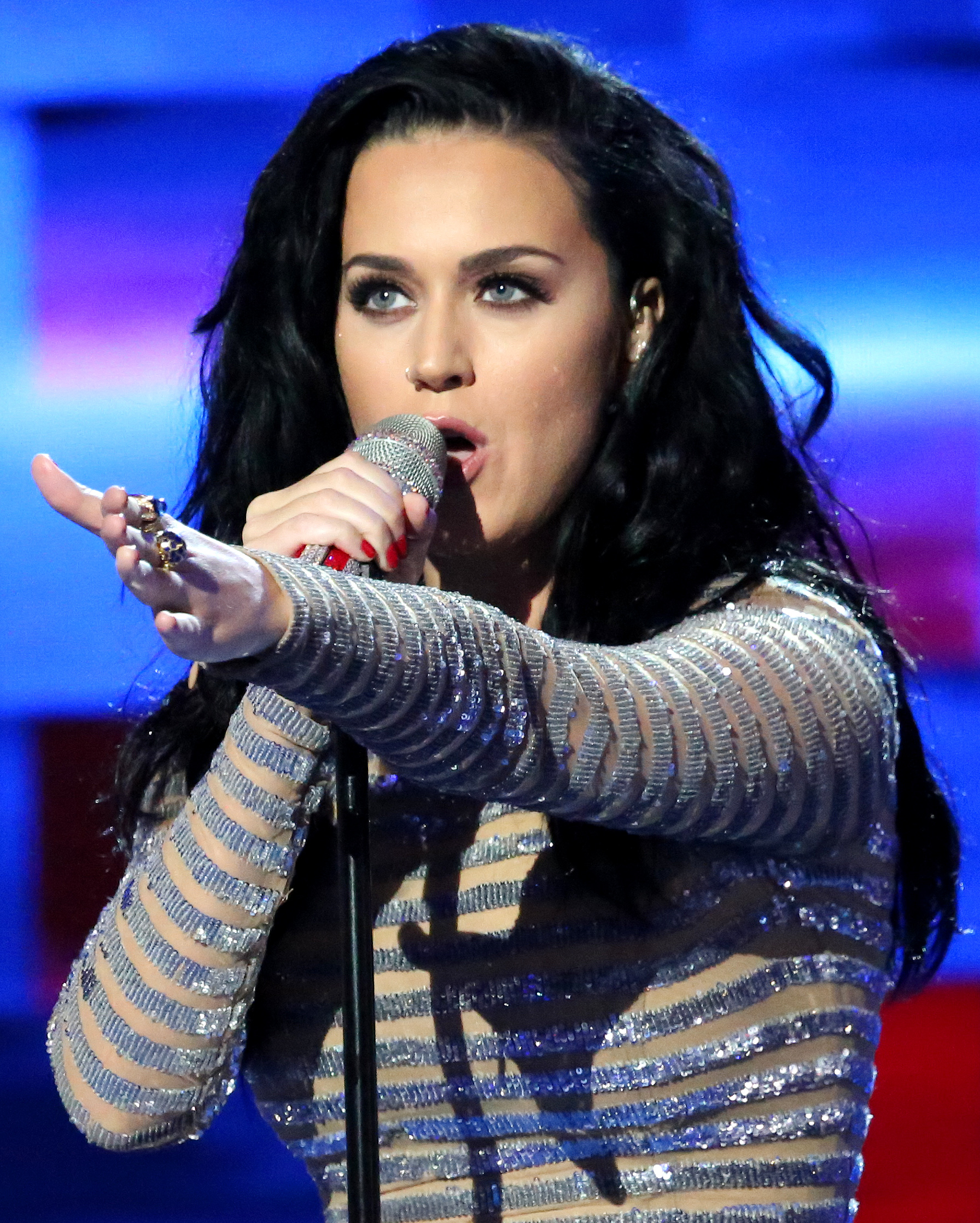
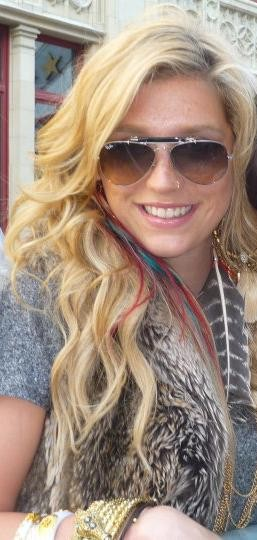
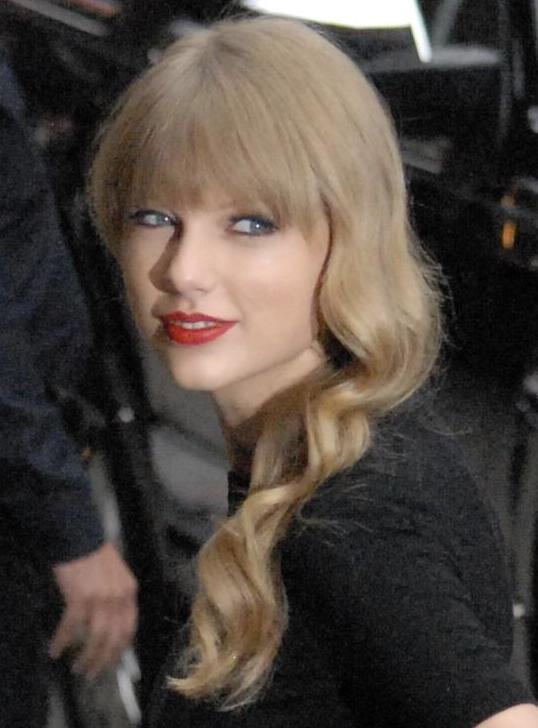
Critics compared "Here's To Never Growing Up" to the works of Katy Perry (left), Kesha (center), and Taylor Swift (right).

"Here's To Never Growing Up" received mostly mixed reviews from music critics. Idolator praised the song, stating that it was different than the typical dance-pop songs and named it the Song of the Summer 2013. Digital Spy critic Robert Cospey gave the song a three stars out of five rating, writing "The result is nothing she hasn't given us before, but there's no harm in having one last hurrah". Melinda Newman of HitFix provided a mixed review, writing that "You may find yourself begrudgingly clapping your hands and swaying to the generic "Here’s To Never Growing Up", but you won't like yourself for doing so. It feels like it was crafted in some pop lab as "the song" that will get Lavigne back on the charts". Tris McCall from New Jersey On-Line was more positive, commenting that the song "likely to be a summertime anthem" and compared its theme to songs by Lavigne's contemporaries such as "22" by Taylor Swift, "We Are Young" by fun., and "Teenage Dream" by Katy Perry. Entertainment Weekly's Kyle Anderson deemed "Here's To Never Growing Up" "a classic drinking tune" and compared the song's theme to Kesha's "Die Young" and Pink's "Raise Your Glass". A reviewer from The Huffington Post also thought that the track was similar to works by Kesha and Taylor Swift, calling it "a bouncy anthem".

== Commercial performance ==
On the chart dated 27 April 2013, the song debuted at number 52 on the Billboard Hot 100, marking Lavigne's 16th entry in the chart. The song reached a peak at number 20 in the week of 29 June, becoming her 10th top 40 in United States and causing the song to surge from 23rd to 7th on the Digital Songs chart with more than 131,000 downloads sold that week. Four months after its release, the song received a RIAA Platinum certification in the United States with 1 million digital paid copies sold. As of September 2015, "Here's to Never Growing Up" has sold 1.3 million copies in the United States and more than 2.5 million copies worldwide. It was the biggest free faller in two weeks in a row before dropping out after spending 15 weeks on the chart. It is Avril Lavigne’s highest peaking song to fail to crack the year end; "Don't Tell Me" even had a lower peak and showed up in the 2004 year-end chart.

"Here's To Never Growing Up" debuted on ARIA Singles Chart at number 16 and one week later peaked at number 15. The song peaked at number 7 in Ireland, 8 in Scotland and 14 in the United Kingdom. The song was well received in Asia where in most of the countries it stood atop the charts. It did extremely well in China, where it grabbed the 2nd Most played song of the year 2013 before Rock n' Roll.

=== Accolades ===
Award/Publisher	Year	Category	Result	Ref.
Billboard.com Mid-Year Music Awards	2013	Best Music Video	Nominated	
MuchMusic Video Awards	2013	International Video of the Year By A Canadian	Won	
Radio Disney Music Awards	2014	Best Song to Rock Out to With Your BFF	Nominated	
World Music Awards	2014	World's Best Song	Nominated	
World Music Awards	2014	World's Best Video	Nominated	

== Music video ==
Lavigne referred the Let Go era while skateboarding wearing a tie.

The music video was directed by Robert Hales, with photography by Ketil Dietrichson and art direction by Lenny Tso. On 8 April 2013, Lavigne began shooting the video for the song, the second day of the shooting was on 19 April, confirmed by Lavigne on Twitter and the official premiere was on 9 May. The video shows Lavigne playing with her band, which included Lavigne's original guitarist, Evan Taubenfeld, who returned for the music video, at a school during the senior prom. It also features scenes of Lavigne and her friends having a fun time at the school, eventually causing chaos. It also shows scenes of Lavigne singing in an empty classroom, that eventually shows all her friends dancing and having fun. The video makes allusions to Lavigne's first music video "Complicated", wearing the same outfit and skateboarding.

== Live performances ==
Lavigne performed the song several times throughout the months following its release. The first live performance of the single was at The Tonight Show with Jay Leno on 26 April 2013. She also performed it on the semi-final results on Dancing with the Stars on 14 May, and on Today on 17 May 2013. Lavigne sang the song on the Wango Tango on 11 May 2013. She also performed it on 4 June 2013 on MTV Buzzworthy, 14 June, on Live! with Kelly and Michael, on 15 June, on 12 July 2013, on the UK TV show Daybreak, on 20 September 2013, on We Day and on 26 September, she performed the song along with 'Rock N Roll' on Jimmy Kimmel Live!.

Lavigne also gave acoustic performances of the song during her radio promotional tour on April and May 2013.

== Track listing ==
Digital download

1. "Here's to Never Growing Up" – 3:35

CD single

1. "Here's to Never Growing Up" – 3:35
2. "Here's to Never Growing Up" (Instrumental) – 3:35

== Credits and personnel ==
- Backing vocals, lead vocals, drums – Avril Lavigne
- Songwriting, guitar, drums – Avril Lavigne, Martin Johnson, Chad Kroeger, David Hodges, J. Kash
- Production, guitar, drums – Martin Johnson, additional by Kyle Moorman and Brandon Paddock
- Mixing – Serban Ghenea
- Engineering – Kyle Moorman, Brandon Paddock

== Charts and certifications ==
=== Weekly charts ===
Weekly chart performance for "Here's to Never Growing Up"
Chart (2013)	Peak position
Australia (ARIA)	15
Austria (Ö3 Austria Top 40)	49
Belgium (Ultratip Bubbling Under Flanders)	10
Belgium (Ultratip Bubbling Under Wallonia)	3
Brazil Hot 100 Airplay (Billboard Brasil)	3
Canada Hot 100 (Billboard)	17
Canada AC (Billboard)	35
Canada CHR/Top 40 (Billboard)	26
Canada Hot AC (Billboard)	18
Czech Republic Airplay (ČNS IFPI)	27
China (Sino Chart)	4
France (SNEP)	63
Germany (GfK)	60
Ireland (IRMA)	7
Italy (FIMI)	19
Japan Hot 100 (Billboard)	8
Japan (Japan Hot Overseas)	1
Netherlands (Single Top 100)	85
Netherlands (Dutch Top 40)	28
New Zealand (Recorded Music NZ)	24
Poland (Polish Airplay New)	1
Scottish Singles Sales (Official Charts)	8
South Korea (Gaon International Chart)	2
Slovakia Airplay (ČNS IFPI)	95
South Africa Airplay (EMA)	7
Spain (Promusicae)	29
UK Singles (Official Charts)	14
Ukraine Airplay (TopHit)	67
US Billboard Hot 100	20
US Adult Pop Airplay (Billboard)	21
US Pop Airplay (Billboard)	19

=== Year-end charts ===
Year-end chart performance for "Here's to Never Growing Up"
Chart (2013)	Position
Canada (Canadian Hot 100)	79
Netherlands (Dutch Top 40)	153
South Korea (Gaon International Chart)	91
Taiwan (Hito Radio)	12
Ukraine Airplay (TopHit)	102

=== Certifications ===
Region	Certification	Certified units/sales
Australia (ARIA)	Platinum	70,000^{^}
Canada (Music Canada)	3× Platinum	240,000^{‡}
South Korea	—	93,907
New Zealand (RMNZ)	Gold	7,500^{*}
United Kingdom (BPI)	Silver	200,000^{‡}
United States (RIAA)	2× Platinum	2,000,000
^{*} Sales figures based on certification alone.^{^} Shipments figures based on certification alone.^{‡} Sales+streaming figures based on certification alone.

== Release history ==
List of release dates, showing region, release format, and label
Region	Date	Format	Label	Ref.
Various	9 April 2013	Digital download	Epic	
Germany	9 April 2013	Digital download	Sony Music	
Philippines	9 April 2013	Digital download	Sony Music	
United States	9 April 2013	Contemporary hit radio	Epic	
Italy	12 April 2013	Contemporary hit radio	Sony Music	
United States	15 April 2013	Hot/Modern/AC radio	Epic	
Taiwan	17 May 2013	CD single	Sony Music	
United Kingdom	14 July 2013	Digital download	Epic	
China	1 August 2013	CD single	Sony Music	
