= Cheers (Drink to That) =

Single by Rihanna

from the album Loud
- Released: August 2, 2011
- Recorded: February 2010
- Studio: EastWest Studios (Los Angeles, CA); Westlake Recording Studios (Hollywood, CA)
- Genre: Pop rock; R&B
- Length: 4:22
- Label: Def Jam; SRP
- Songwriters: Andrew Harr; Jermaine Jackson; Stacy Barthe; Laura Pergolizzi; Corey Gibson; Chris Ivery; Avril Lavigne; Lauren Christy; Scott Spock; Graham Edwards; Robyn Fenty
- Producer: The Runners

Rihanna singles chronology
"California King Bed" (2011)	"Cheers (Drink to That)" (2011)	"Fly" (2011)

Music video
- "Cheers (Drink to That)" on YouTube

"Cheers (Drink to That)" is a song recorded by Barbadian singer Rihanna, from her fifth studio album, Loud (2010). The song impacted American mainstream and rhythmic radio on August 2, 2011, as the seventh and final single released from Loud. The song was written by Andrew Harr, Jermaine Jackson, Stacy Barthe, LP, Corey Gibson, Chris Ivery, Lauren Christy, Graham Edwards, Avril Lavigne, Rihanna and Scott Spock, while production of the song was completed by Harr and Jackson under their stage name, the Runners. The song also contains samples from Lavigne's song "I'm with You", which is featured on her debut album Let Go (2002). Lyrically, "Cheers (Drink to That)" is a party song featuring multiple references to the weekend.

The song received positive reviews from music critics, who praised the interpolation of the sample and also commented that it should prove to be a successful club song due to its lyrical content. "Cheers (Drink to That)" reached number one in Lebanon, the top 10 in Australia, Canada, New Zealand, and the United States, and the top 40 in Ireland, Slovakia, and the United Kingdom. The music video for the song, directed by Evan Rogers and Ciara Pardo, shows footage of the singer on tour and enjoying different activities during her homecoming trip to Barbados. "Cheers (Drink to That)" was included on the set list of the Loud Tour (2011).

== Background and composition ==
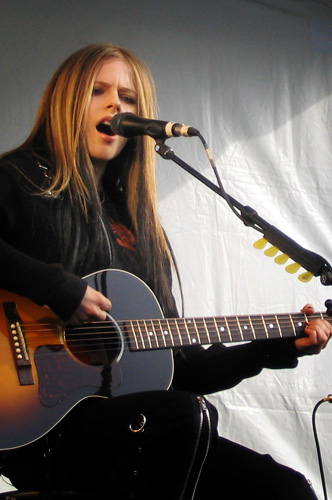
"Cheers" samples "I'm with You" by Avril Lavigne from her 2002 album Let Go.

Rihanna first announced that "Cheers (Drink to That)" would be the next single to be released from Loud via her official Twitter account, when she tweeted to celebrity internet blogger Perez Hilton that his "favourite song" from the album would become the next single. The song was sent to contemporary hit and rhythmic contemporary radios in the United States on August 2, 2011. "Cheers (Drink to That)" was written by hip hop production duo Andrew Harr and Jermaine Jackson, Stacey Barthe, Laura "LP" Pergolizzi, Corey Gibson, Chris Ivery, Lauren Christy, Graham Edwards, Avril Lavigne, Scott Spock and Rihanna herself, and the main vocal tracks were produced by Makeba Riddick, while its instrumental and backing vocal tracks was produced by Harr and Jackson under their stage name, the Runners.

In an interview with MTV News in late 2010, Rihanna spoke of how "Cheers (Drink to That)" was one of her favorite songs on the album, saying "I love that song ['Cheers']. That is one of my favorite songs on the album. It makes you feel like celebrating ... It gives you a great feeling inside, like you want to go out and have a drink ... People can't wait for the weekend." Also in an interview with MTV News in late 2010, Avril Lavigne spoke about being included on the song, saying, "It was really exciting because 'I'm With You' is one of my favorite songs that I've done, I always love performing it."

"Cheers (Drink to That)" is a pop rock and R&B song. It contains samples of Lavigne's song "I'm with You", which is featured on her album Let Go (2002). According to the digital music sheet published at musicnotes.com, the song is written in the key of E major and is set in simple time with a moderated hip-hop groove. Rihanna's vocal range in the song spans from the low note of E_{3} to the high note of C_{5}. Lyrically, "Cheers (Drink to That)" is a party or drinking song, and this is exemplified by the verse "Life's too short to be sittin' around miserable/ People are gonna talk whether you're doin' bad or good/ Don't let the bastards get you down/ Turn it around with another round." The line "Don't let the bastards get you down" is taken from a mug that LP's late father used to drink coffee from. According to Ryan Dombal of Pitchfork, the lyrics sum up the general sentiment of Loud, which as an album is less reflective of tabloid speculation than her previous release, Rated R (2009).

== Critical reception ==
On its release as a single, "Cheers (Drink to That)" received positive reviews from music critics. Mark Savage of BBC Music described the song as "a funky, loping guitar groove for a night out on the town," which Rihanna dedicated to "all the semi-alcoholics in the world." Robert Copsey of Digital Spy praised the interpolation of Lavigne's song, calling it "unbelievably catchy", as well as commenting that the track would succeed in bars and clubs thanks to the lyrics referencing alcohol and going out. Jon Pareles of The New York Times commented that "Cheers (Drink to That)" is written for "barroom singalongs." According to Leah Greenblatt from Entertainment Weekly, "the Jameson-swilling, TGIF-toasting 'Cheers (Drink to That),' folds a left-field Avril Lavigne sample into a crunked party anthem."

Amy Sciarretto of PopCrush also commended "Cheers (Drink to That)" and its musical style, writing that "the song is infused with the tropical island groove that she has explored on 'Loud' and which harks back to her upbringing in Barbados." Sciarretto also noted that "Cheers (Drink to That)" would be very popular in bars and clubs because of the lyrical content. Andy Gill of The Independent called the song an anthem with which the weekend can start. Thomas Conner of the Chicago Sun-Times said that "Cheers (Drink to That)" is the best song on the album, saying "[the song is] a wise, world-weary paean from a gal at the bar who's seen some stuff, has moved on and wants to buy everybody a round of fruity shots." However, Chris Richards of The Washington Post stated that "Cheers (Drink to That)" did not meet his expectations and commented that the song is a lowlight in Rihanna's career, stating "'Turn it around with another round,' Rihanna bellows over the mid slog, as if setting ad copy to music."

== Chart performance ==
In the issue dated August 3, 2011, "Cheers (Drink to That)" debuted on the US Billboard Hot 100 chart at number 91, and leaped to a new peak of 50 on August 10, 2011. The following week, the song rose to number 25 and by its fourth week, "Cheers (Drink to That)" rose again to number 17, giving Rihanna her 22nd top 20 on the chart. In its fifth week, the song rose to number 11, where it remained in its sixth week. On its seven-week, the song charted at number 10. The song has peaked at number seven, making "Cheers (Drink to That)" the singer's fourth top 10 hit from Loud and 19th overall top 10 song in the US. "Cheers (Drink to That)" also debuted on the US Mainstream Top 40 chart at number 35 in the issue dated August 3, 2011. The following week, the song climbed ten positions to a new peak of 25, and became that week's "Greatest Gainer" on the chart and Rihanna's 26th song to reach the top 40. In its third week, the song reached a new peak of 16, and rose to number 11 the following week, where it remained for another week. On December 13, 2011, "S&M" was certified double platinum by the Recording Industry Association of America (RIAA), denoting shipments of over two million copies. "Cheers (Drink to That)" ranked at number 77 on Billboard magazine's Hot 100 songs of 2011. In Canada, the song debuted at number 89 on August 17, 2011, and advanced to 37 the following week, ultimately peaking at number six in its third week on the charts.

In Australia, the song debuted at number 46 on the Australian Singles Chart on August 14, 2011, and peaked at number 18 the following week. In its seventh week on the chart, the song reached a new peak of number six. The song has been certified Gold by the Australian Recording Industry Association, denoting shipments of over 35,000 units. In New Zealand, the song debuted at number 14 on the New Zealand Singles Chart on August 8, 2011, and reached a peak of number five the following week, however it fell to number eight in its third week. In the United Kingdom, the song also debuted inside the top 40 of the UK R&B Chart at number 38 on August 27, 2011, after having charted at number 47 the week before. The following week, the song rose to number 21, sitting one position lower than Rihanna's previous single, "California King Bed." In its sixth week, the song climbed to number four. The song has so far peaked at number 15 on the UK Singles Chart. In Ireland, the song debuted at number 30 on the Irish Singles Chart on September 8, 2011, and has peaked at number 16. In France, the song debuted at number 88 on September 3, 2011, rose to 82 the following week and peaked at 64 two weeks later.

== Music video ==
=== Background ===
During the Loud Tour concert in Kensington Oval, Barbados, on August 5, 2011, Rihanna announced that a taping of "Cheers (Drink to That)" had been recorded during the show for the song's music video. It was later announced that the video would be expected to feature footage of her homecoming, as well as clips of her performing during the North American leg of the tour. Via Rihanna's official Twitter account, she replied to a fan's tweet, announcing that the video would premiere on August 24, 2011, on iTunes. However, it was later announced that the video would premiere the following day on August 25, 2011. The video premiered officially via iTunes and Vevo on August 26, 2011. A 15-second teaser video was released the day before it officially premiered, and featured Rihanna applying make-up before taking to the stage, as well as fans screaming her name while fireworks were launched into the night sky. The video was directed and edited by New York based director Evan Rogers and Ciara Pardo.

=== Synopsis ===
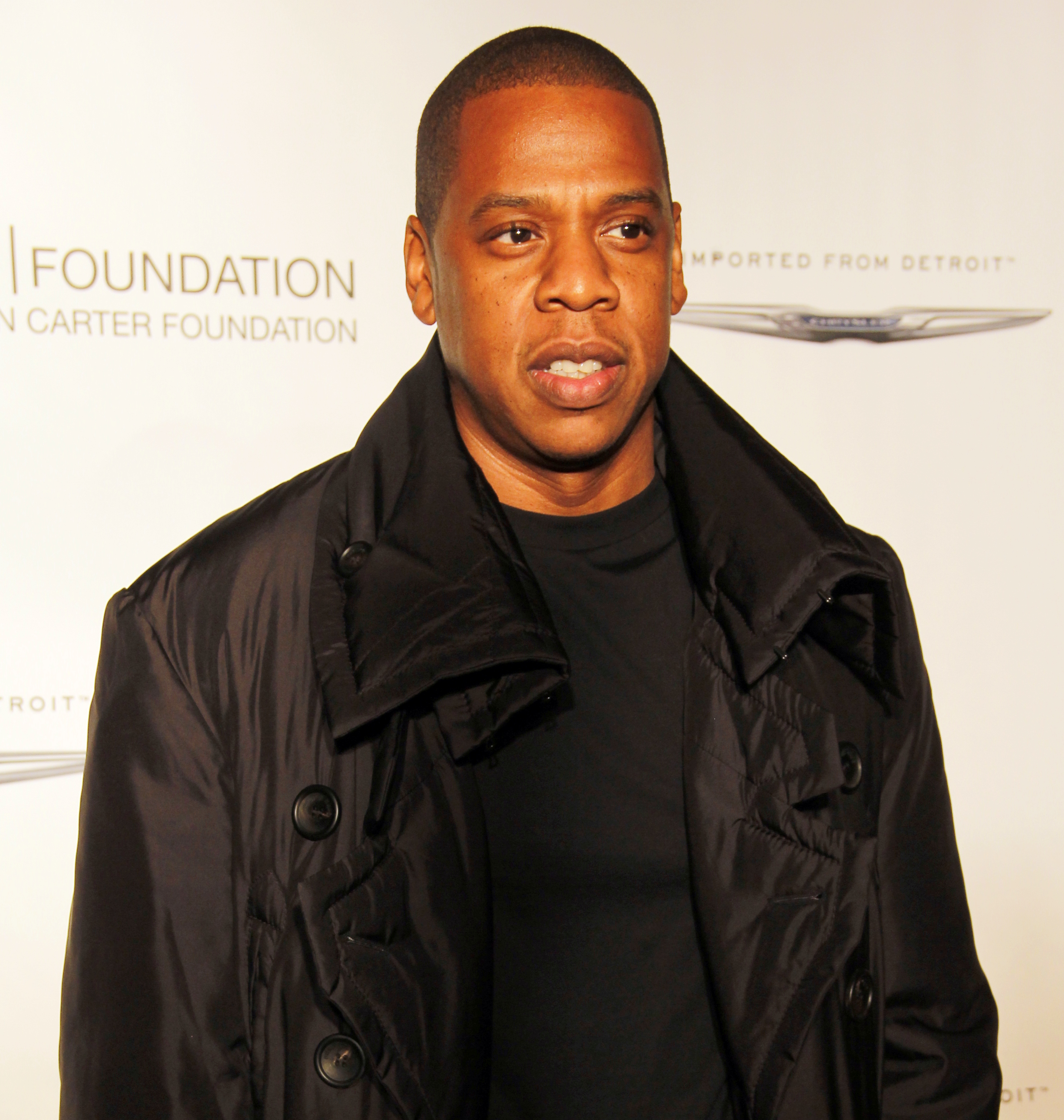
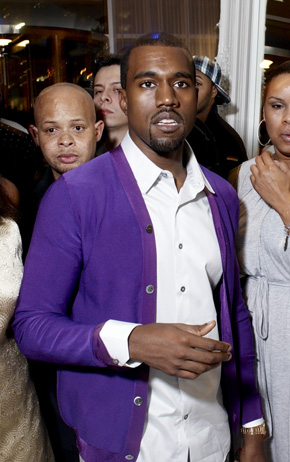
Jay-Z (left) and Kanye West (right) are two of the celebrities who appear in the music video for "Cheers (Drink to That)."

The video begins with Rihanna's fans screaming and cheering her name before a concert is about to start, while Rihanna is shown walking to her dressing room, preparing to perform by doing her make-up and changing outfits. As a firework explodes in the sky, scenes of Rihanna driving through her hometown and having a drink at the bar are intercut. As the song starts to play, Rihanna is seen in a variety of different outfits from various parts of the concert, whilst also showing clips of the audience dancing and singing. Rihanna is also seen holding a handheld camera, which she uses to film herself and other people, as well as goings-on backstage. Avril Lavigne, who makes a cameo appearance in the video, is seen raising her glass to the camera before being pushed fully clothed into a swimming pool while on a skateboard. Jay-Z, Kanye West and CeeLo Green are also featured in the various clips of the video, as the former two were special guests at Rihanna's tour on certain dates, while the latter was an opening act on selected dates during the North American leg of the tour. Shots of Rihanna flying on a private jet, avoiding paparazzi and participating in the Barbados Kadooment Day are also intercut throughout the video. The video ends with Rihanna on a boat shouting "Rihanna Navy!", referring to her fan group.

=== Reception ===
Upon its release, the video received general acclaim from critics. A reviewer from Rap-Up praised the video, commenting that it is a "real blast in a glass!" According to PopDash's Giovanna Falcone, the video shows "Rihanna goofing around with friends and family, on stage and loving life, you can't help but smile throughout." Robbie Daw of Idolator commented that the music video looks "like one big, drunken night out." A reviewer from Rolling Stone magazine also commented that the video "finds Rihanna in an appropriately celebratory mood..... it's mostly a lot of shots of her partying backstage with friends and celebrities." Sarah Maloy of Billboard magazine commented "there are no special effects, storylines – and no chance of lawsuits", referring to one of Rihanna's previous music videos, "S&M", which was faced with two lawsuits. Maloy also noted that the video presents Rihanna's ordinary life just as it is.

A reviewer of OK! commented that "Rihanna gets buddy Avril Lavigne on board in the video for the track 'which will be our anthem for the Bank Holiday weekend.'" Brad Wete of Entertainment Weekly simply commented that "It's party time, folks! And that's exactly what the video makes apparent." With regard to the cameo appearance of several celebrities and Rihanna's colleagues, Leah Collins of The Vancouver Sun stated "Rihanna shows that she has more celebrity friends than hairstyles (which is saying something considering she manages to change her weave approximately every 5 seconds in the clip)." According to William Goodman from Spin magazine "Barbadian pop queen Rihanna leads a charmed life. But at heart, she's just a hometown party girl, and her new video for 'Cheers (Drink to That)' proves it." In reference to raising glasses in the video, Rebeca Ford from The Hollywood Reporter commented "the singer can also be seen raising a [glass] to her audience, probably thanking them for their support with her own personal 'cheers'."

== Live performances ==
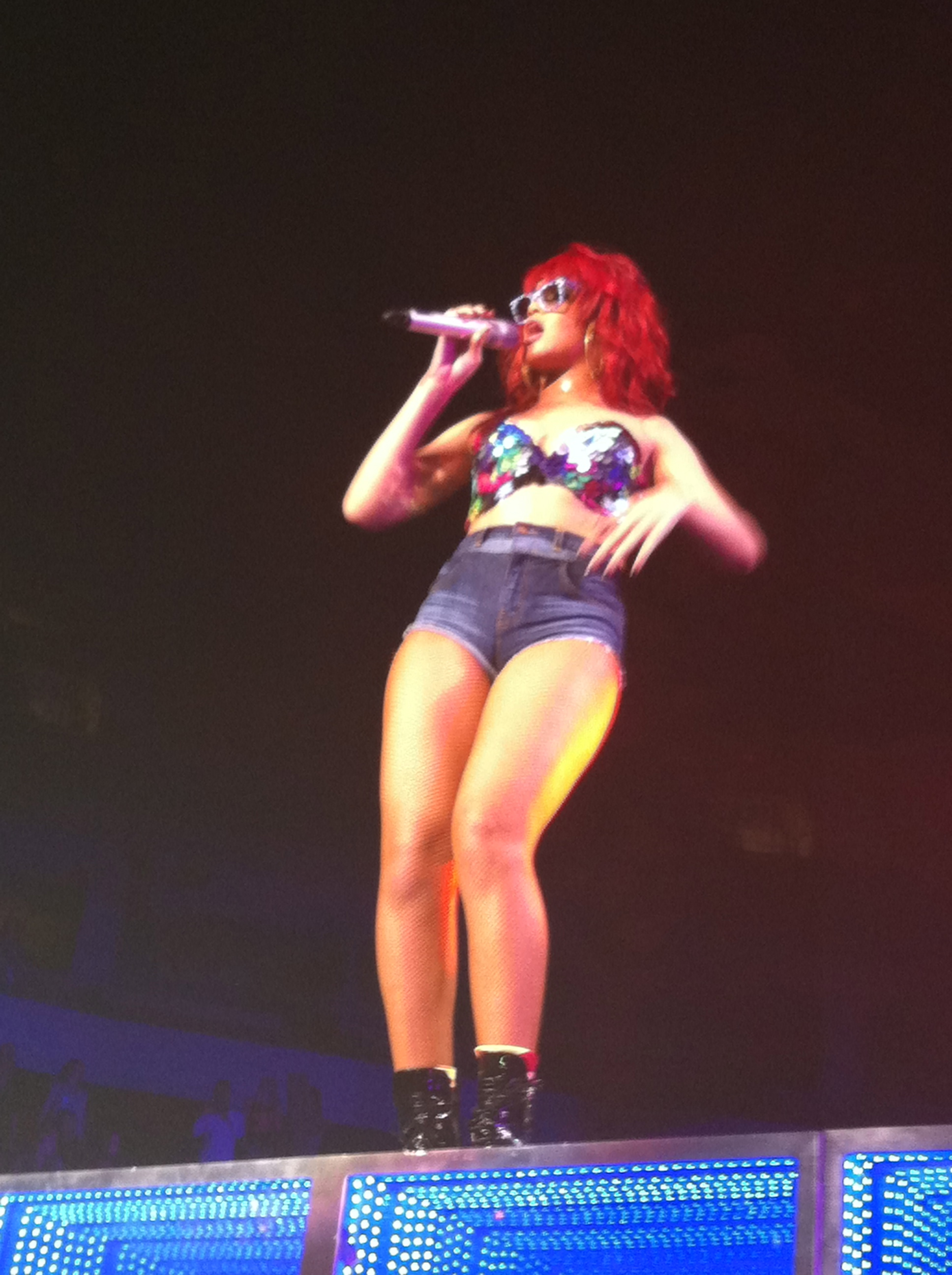
Rihanna performing "Cheers (Drink to That)" during the Loud Tour in Vancouver, Canada on June 24, 2011

"Cheers (Drink to That)" was included on the set list of the Loud Tour (2011). Rihanna also performed the song at V Festival in the United Kingdom on August 20 and 21, 2011.

== Credits and personnel ==
Credits adapted from the liner notes of Loud.

- Songwriting – Andrew Harr, Jermaine Jackson, Stacy Barthe, Laura Pergolizzi, Corey Gibson, Chris Ivery, Lauren Christy, Graham Edwards, Avril Lavigne, Robyn Fenty, Scott Spock
- Production – The Runners
- Vocal production – Makeba Riddick
- Vocal recording and mixing – Marcos Tovar
- Assistant vocal recording – Antonio Resendiz, Inaam Haq, Dane Liska, Brad Shea
- Recording – Jeff "Supa Jeff" Villanueva
- Recording assistant – Ben O'Neill
- Assistant mixing – Bobby Campbell
- Backing vocals – Stacy Barthe, Laura Pergolizzi, Avril Lavigne

== Charts ==
=== Weekly charts ===
Weekly chart performance
Chart (2011)	Peak position
Australia (ARIA)	6
Belgium (Ultratip Bubbling Under Flanders)	12
Belgium (Ultratip Bubbling Under Wallonia)	15
Brazil (Billboard Brasil Hot 100)	62
Brazil Hot Pop Songs	26
Canada Hot 100 (Billboard)	6
Croatia International Airplay (HRT)	4
Czech Republic Airplay (ČNS IFPI)	50
France (SNEP)	64
Ireland (IRMA)	16
Lebanon (Lebanese Top 20)	1
New Zealand (Recorded Music NZ)	5
Scottish Singles Sales (Official Charts)	14
Slovakia Airplay (ČNS IFPI)	17
South Korea (Gaon Chart)	46
Switzerland (Schweizer Hitparade)	66
UK Hip Hop/R&B (Official Charts)	4
UK Singles (Official Charts)	15
US Billboard Hot 100	7
US Adult Pop Airplay (Billboard)	34
US Dance Airplay (Billboard)	19
US Hot R&B/Hip-Hop Songs (Billboard)	74
US Pop Airplay (Billboard)	11
US Rhythmic Airplay (Billboard)	6

=== Year-end charts ===
Yearly chart performance
Chart (2011)	Position
Australia (ARIA)	41
Brazil (Crowley)	78
Canada Hot 100 (Billboard)	66
Croatia International Airplay (HRT)	53
New Zealand (Recorded Music NZ)	30
UK Singles (Official Charts)	128
US Billboard Hot 100	77

Chart (2012)	Position
Brazil (Crowley)	98

== Certifications ==
Certifications
Region	Certification	Certified units/sales
Australia (ARIA)	5× Platinum	350,000^{‡}
New Zealand (RMNZ)	Platinum	15,000^{*}
Sweden (GLF)	Gold	20,000^{‡}
United Kingdom (BPI)	Gold	400,000^{‡}
United States (RIAA)	2× Platinum	2,000,000^{‡}
^{‡} Sales+streaming figures based on certification alone.

== Release history ==
Release dates and formats for "Cheers (Drink to That)"
Region	Date	Format	Label(s)	Ref.
United States	August 2, 2011	Mainstream and rhytmic airplay	Def Jam	
