= Alternative pop =

Music genre

- Other names: Alt-pop
- Stylistic origins: Pop; alternative rock; R&B; electronic; dream pop; indie pop; art pop; synth-pop
- Cultural origins: 1980s–2000s, United Kingdom
- Typical instruments: Singing vocals; electric guitar; electric bass guitar; drum kit; synthesizer; electronic keyboard; DJing

Other topics
- Alternative R&B; avant-pop; dark pop; electropop; experimental pop; hyperpop; noise pop; progressive pop

Alternative pop (also known as alt-pop) is pop music with broad commercial appeal that is made by figures outside the mainstream, or which is considered more original, challenging, or eclectic than traditional pop music. The Independent described alt-pop as "a home-made, personalized imitation of the mainstream that speaks far closer to actual teenage experience", and which is commonly characterized by a dark or downbeat emotional tone with lyrics about insecurity, regret, drugs, and anxiety.

== History ==
According to AllMusic, the alternative scene's "left-of-center pop" failed to experience mainstream success during the 1980s, although the UK alternative pop band Siouxsie and the Banshees saw success in that decade. Canadian singer Avril Lavigne's success in the early 2000s, including her hit single "Sk8er Boi", helped set the stage for a subsequent generation of female alt-pop singers. In the late 2000s, American singer Santigold established herself as an "alternative pop hero" due to her apparent artistic conviction.

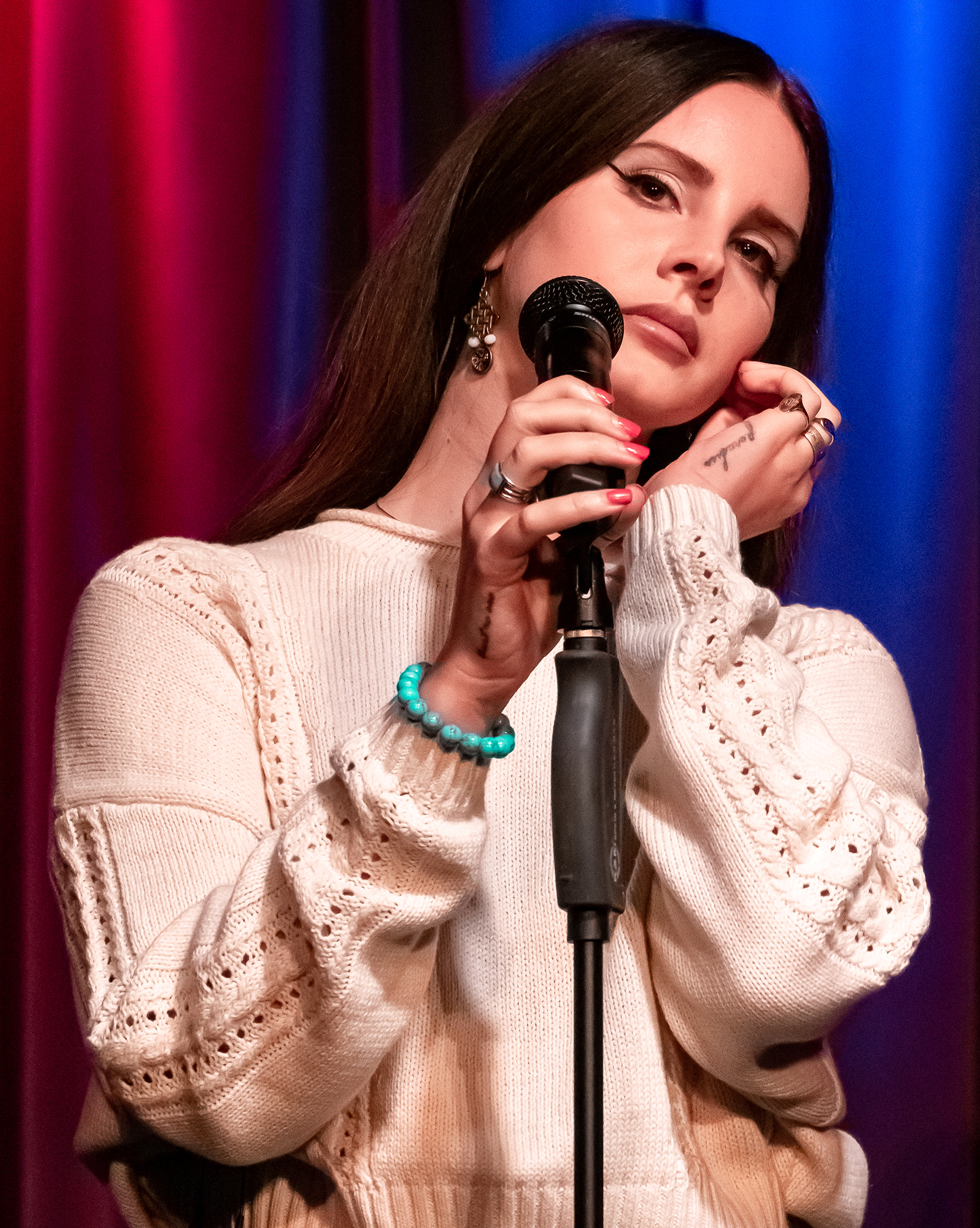
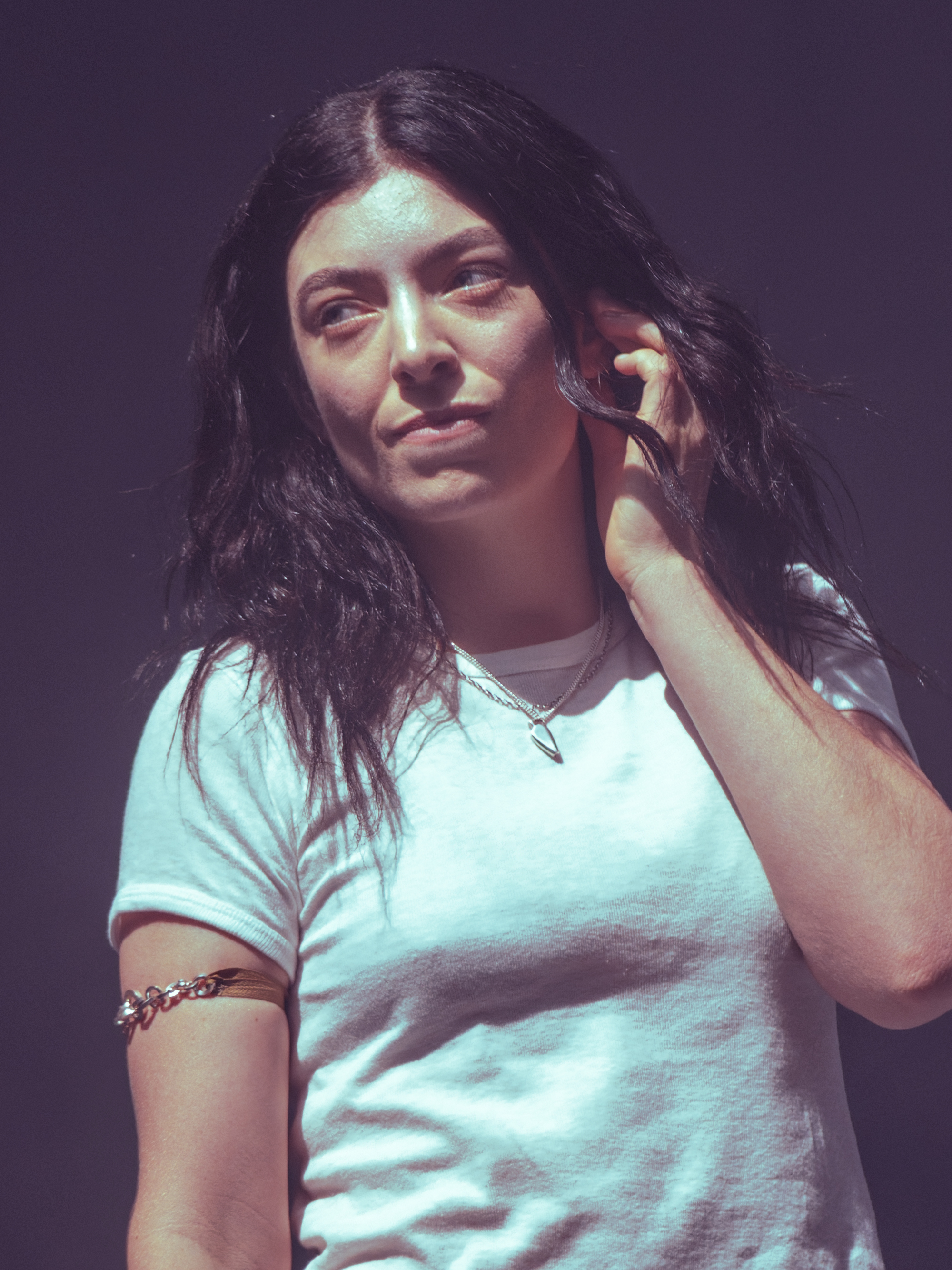
Artists such as Lana Del Rey (left) and Lorde (right) have helped define a major shift in 21st-century alternative and indie pop

In the early 2010s, American singer-songwriter Lana Del Rey developed a "cult-like following" with her "cinematic, beat-heavy alt-pop," which was characterized by poetic lyrics filled with an "alluring sadness and melodrama." New Zealand alt-pop singer Lorde achieved global success in 2013 and 2014, topping charts and winning awards. In 2022, American singer Billie Eilish was credited with marking the "ascendence" of alternative pop in the mainstream with her dark, downbeat pop.
