= I'm with You (Avril Lavigne song) =

2002 single by Avril Lavigne

Single by Avril Lavigne

from the album Let Go
- B-side: "Unwanted"
- Released: November 18, 2002
- Studio: Decoy (Valley Village)
- Genre: Pop rock
- Length: 3:44
- Label: Arista
- Songwriters: Avril Lavigne; Lauren Christy; Scott Spock; Graham Edwards
- Producer: The Matrix

Avril Lavigne singles chronology
"Sk8er Boi" (2002)	"I'm with You" (2002)	"Losing Grip" (2003)

Audio sample
- file; help

Music video
- "I'm with You" on YouTube

"I'm with You" is a song by Canadian singer-songwriter Avril Lavigne from her debut studio album Let Go (2002). A power ballad, it was released to radio as the third single from the album on November 18, 2002, by Arista Records. The song was written by Lavigne and the production team the Matrix, who solely helmed its production. According to Lavigne, the song was inspired by feelings of loneliness she experienced over being single.

"I'm With You" peaked at number 18 on the Canadian Singles Chart. Outside of Canada, "I'm with you" peaked within the top ten of the charts in ten countries, including Ireland, Italy, New Zealand, the United Kingdom, and the United States. In the latter country, "I'm With You" topped two Billboard listings: the Adult Top 40 and the Mainstream Top 40. "I'm with You" received radio and television airplay in Australia, but it was not officially released there. The track was nominated for several awards following its release, winning two ASCAP Awards, a BMI Pop Music Award, and a SOCAN Award. It was the second Lavigne song to be nominated for a Grammy in the categories Song of the Year and Best Female Pop Vocal Performance at the 46th Annual Grammy Awards.

== Composition and lyrics ==
"I'm with You" is a pop rock power ballad, written by Lavigne and the production team the Matrix. According to the sheet music published at Musicnotes.com by Alfred Publishing, the song is written in the key of A major and is set in a 6/8 time signature. Lavigne's vocal range spans two octaves, from A_{3} to E_{5}. According to Lavigne, the song was written when she was having a "depressing day" due to feelings of loneliness over being single. According to The Matrix member, Lauren Christy, in a YouTube short, Christy claims responsibility for much of the melody: "Now, one of the things about Avril is she just has a voice that doesn't have any limit to it. She's incredible and I love to write melodies that I can't really sing."

== Critical reception ==
Billboard senior editor Chuck Taylor referred to the song as a "beautifully performed, musically sophisticated outing that showcases a surprisingly emotional vocal from [Lavigne]." He further praised the song's universal appeal, believing that its theme relates well to both teenagers and adults. Sal Cinquemani of Slant Magazine described the song as "sweet." Jamieson Cox of Pitchfork described the song as a power ballad and compared it to B-sides released by American rock band Aerosmith in the late Nineties.

The arrangement of singles from Let Go, with "I'm with You" as the third, was regarded as "controversial choices", given that "I'm with You" was "thought by some to be the biggest potential smash on the album", and could have established Lavigne as a more mature artist if it was released first. According to Reid, "Some people just really didn't get that. And with the first video, there was some concern that maybe because it's so young and so playful, it might alienate more serious music lovers." KidsWorld called it "the perfect song to drown your sorrows to when that guy from your class breaks your heart."

== Chart performance ==
"I'm with You" became Lavigne's third top 10 song when it peaked at number four on the Billboard Hot 100 in 2003 during its ninth week on the chart. The song spent 10 consecutive weeks on the top 10 and 27 weeks on the Hot 100 making it Lavigne's second-longest staying song on this chart, surpassed by her debut single "Complicated" which stayed on the chart for 31 weeks. "I'm with You" ranked at number 18 on the Billboard Year-End Hot 100 singles of 2003 and number 13 on the Canadian Singles Chart. The song was certified gold by Recording Industry Association of America in 2006 for sales of over 500,000 copies in the United States. As of July 2013, "I'm with You" had sold 556,000 digital copies in the US. As a double A-side DVD single, the "I'm with You"/"Sk8er Boi" video single was certified gold and platinum in 2003.

In United Kingdom, "I'm with You" was released on March 31, 2003. The song debuted and peaked at number seven on the UK Singles Chart in 2003, becoming her third top 10 single on the chart; the song re-entered in UK Singles Chart in the week of December 17, 2011, in number 58. It debuted at number six and peaked at number five in Ireland, staying in the top 10 for six weeks. "I'm with You" reached top five in New Zealand; top 10 in Belgium and the Netherlands; top 20 in Sweden, Switzerland, Austria, Germany, Norway and Denmark as well as reaching the top 40 in France. The song re-entered the UK Singles Chart on December 10, 2011, at number 58, almost 10 years after the song first charted.

== Music video ==
=== Background ===
The music video was directed by David LaChapelle in Los Angeles, California. Filmed in November 2002, most of the video is shown in slow motion but Lavigne's mouth movements are in sync with the song's vocals. This was achieved by recording the footage while the song was played twice as fast. It was at least partly filmed in Los Angeles with the street shots were filmed on Broadway, and the Orpheum Theatre is seen, with the snow banks CGI'd in.

=== Synopsis and reception ===
Lavigne in a pub in the song's music video.

The video depicts Lavigne, who is seen alone, trying to find someone, whilst her band members play the song alone in the streets. Showing her originally at a party, the video also sees Lavigne pushing a guy when he tries to get with her straight after making out with another woman. The video also sees Lavigne walking on the streets and wearing a black jacket. Through the video, she is seen standing behind a snowy bank. At the end of the video, Lavigne walks out of the club with her coat on, kicks out the door and walks away.

Much Music named the video one of the "Top 100 Best Videos of All Time". The music video was originally meant to end with Lavigne walking out of the club to her bandmates, who then greet her and walk off together into the distance, but this ending was removed during post-production, ending the video with her leaving alone. An alternative version of the video leaked online to the internet, comprising alternate shots, slightly longer sequences and featuring the originally filmed ending.

== Accolades ==
"I'm with You" was nominated for the 2004 Grammy Award for Song of the Year, and for Best Female Pop Vocal Performance but lost to Luther Vandross's "Dance with My Father" and Christina Aguilera's "Beautiful" respectively.

Key
†	Indicates non-competitive categories

Accolades for "I'm with You"
Year	Organization	Award	Result	Ref.
2003	Billboard Music Awards	Mainstream Top 40 Single of the Year	Nominated	
2003	MTV Video Music Awards	Best Female Video	Nominated	
2003	Radio Disney Music Awards	Best Song That Makes You Turn Up the Radio	Nominated	
2003	Radio Music Awards	Song of the Year/Modern Adult Contemporary Radio	Nominated	
2003	Radio Music Awards	Song of the Year/Top 40 Radio	Nominated	
2003	Teen Choice Awards	Choice Music: Love Song	Nominated	
2004	APRA Music Awards	Most Performed Foreign Work	Nominated	
2004	ASCAP Film and Television Music Awards	Most Performed Song from a Motion Picture †	Won	
2004	ASCAP Pop Music Awards	Most Performed Song † (valid for Avril Lavigne's songwriting credit)	Won	
2004	BMI Pop Music Awards	Award-Winning Song † (valid for The Matrix songwriting credit)	Won	
2004	Grammy Awards	Song of the Year	Nominated	
2004	Grammy Awards	Best Female Pop Vocal Performance	Nominated	
2004	SOCAN Awards	Pop/Rock Music Award †	Won	

== Track listings and formats ==
- CD single
1. "I'm with You" (album version) – 3:44
2. "I'm with You" (live version) – 3:57
- Cassette and maxi single
1. "I'm with You" (album version) – 3:44
2. "I'm with You" (live) – 3:57
3. "Unwanted" (live) – 4:01
- DVD single
1. "I'm with You"
2. "Sk8er Boi"
3. "Behind-the-Scenes Footage"
4. "Let Go TV Spots"

== Credits and personnel ==
Credits and personnel are adapted from the Let Go album liner notes.

- Avril Lavigne – writer, lead vocals
- The Matrix – writer, producer, arrangement, recording, additional vocals
- Tom Lord-Alge – mixing
- Femio Hernandez – mixing assistant
- Corky James – guitars
- Suzi Katayama – cello

== Charts ==
=== Weekly charts ===
Weekly chart performance for "I'm with You"
Chart (2003)	Peak position
Austria (Ö3 Austria Top 40)	13
Belgium (Ultratop 50 Flanders)	9
Belgium (Ultratop 50 Wallonia)	39
Canada (Nielsen SoundScan)	18
Canada Radio (Nielsen BDS)	1
Canada AC (Nielsen BDS)	1
Canada CHR/Top 40 (Nielsen BDS)	1
Croatia International Airplay (HRT)	8
Denmark (Tracklisten)	20
El Salvador (Notimex)	5
Europe (Eurochart Hot 100)	17
France (SNEP)	34
Germany (GfK)	13
Greece (IFPI)	12
Hungary (Editors' Choice Top 40)	19
Ireland (IRMA)	5
Italy (FIMI)	5
Netherlands (Dutch Top 40)	9
Netherlands (Single Top 100)	18
New Zealand (Recorded Music NZ)	5
Norway (VG-lista)	16
Poland (Polish Airplay Chart)	5
Romania (Romanian Top 100)	22
Scottish Singles Sales (Official Charts)	6
Sweden (Sverigetopplistan)	11
Switzerland (Schweizer Hitparade)	12
UK Singles (Official Charts)	7
US Billboard Hot 100	4
US Adult Contemporary (Billboard)	18
US Adult Pop Airplay (Billboard)	1
US Pop Airplay (Billboard)	1

=== Year-end charts ===
Year-end chart performance for "I'm with You"
Chart (2003)	Position
Belgium (Ultratop 50 Flanders)	62
Brazil (Crowley)	25
Ireland (IRMA)	53
Netherlands (Dutch Top 40)	72
New Zealand (RIANZ)	16
Sweden (Hitlistan)	92
Switzerland (Schweizer Hitparade)	83
UK Singles (OCC)	120
US Billboard Hot 100	18
US Adult Contemporary (Billboard)	35
US Adult Top 40 (Billboard)	6
US Mainstream Top 40 (Billboard)	2

== Certifications ==
Certifications and sales for "I'm with You"
Region	Certification	Certified units/sales
Canada (Music Canada)	Platinum	80,000^{‡}
New Zealand (RMNZ)	Platinum	30,000^{‡}
United Kingdom (BPI)	Platinum	600,000^{‡}
United States (RIAA)	Platinum	1,000,000^{‡}
United States (RIAA) For video single, combined with "Sk8er Boi"	Platinum	50,000^{^}
^{^} Shipments figures based on certification alone.^{‡} Sales+streaming figures based on certification alone.

== Release history ==
Release dates and formats for "I'm with You"
Region	Date	Format(s)	Label	Ref.
United States	November 18, 2002	Contemporary hit radio; hot adult contemporary radio	Arista	
Germany	March 3, 2003	CD	Arista	
United States	March 11, 2003	DVD	Arista	
United Kingdom	March 31, 2003	Cassette; CD	Arista	

== In media, covers and samples ==
"I'm with You" was later featured in the season 3 Scrubs episode "My Tormented Mentor", in the Smallville episode "Accelerate" and in the movie Bruce Almighty. The song was also used in the 2003 Brazilian soap opera Mulheres Apaixonadas. Furthermore, it was featured in the video game Karaoke Revolution Volume 2 and in Singstar Rock Ballads. The song is also used as the background music for the Panasonic Lumix DMC-G85/G80 commercial, with Jennifer Garner and Cate Blanchett. The song was used also in the end of the pilot of the Tarzan.

Rihanna sampled the song on her track "Cheers (Drink to That)", which was released as a single. Lavigne made an appearance in the music video. Polish-Czech singer Ewa Farna covered the song and it was featured as a track on her album Měls mě vůbec rád.

Sophie Evans covered the song in Week 3 of Over the Rainbow. A year later, Amelia Lily covered the song in Week 9 of series 8 of The X Factor.

British singer Yungblud covered the song as part of his segment for BBC Radio 1's annual Live lounge month. He mashed-up the song with Taylor Swift's "Cardigan" (2020), accompanying himself on an acoustic guitar, joined by a cellist and two violinists, resulting in a cheerful, strings-laden performance. Both artists responded to the medley affirmatively.

Scottish synth-pop band Chvrches covered the song in their Apple Music Home Session, released on September 24, 2021.

"I'm With You" was featured in the 2024 Marvel Cinematic Universe film Deadpool & Wolverine, as well as appearing on the official soundtrack for the film.

In May 2025, Allianz Australia launched their new "Care You Can Count On" campaign, using "I'm With You" in the advertisements. Laura Helbert, the general manager of the customer strategy and marketing department at Allianz, said the song choice was an opportunity to use the element of nostalgia, stating: "It perfectly evokes all the feelings you can only hope that someone will feel when they watch a television commercial and for many of our customers, we knew it would bring back lots of nostalgia."
