= Let Go (Avril Lavigne album) =

2002 debut album by Avril Lavigne

Studio album by Avril Lavigne
- Released: June 4, 2002
- Studios: Big Baby Recording (New York City); Blue Iron Gate Studio (Santa Monica, California); Boulevard Recording Studios (New Milford, New Jersey); Decoy Studios (Valley Village, California); Jsm Studios (New York City); Real Music Studios (Los Angeles, California); Signet Sound Delux Studios (Hollywood, California); Top Floor Studios (New York City)
- Genres: Pop-punk; alternative rock; pop rock; post-grunge
- Length: 48:37
- Label: Arista
- Producers: Curt Frasca; Clif Magness; the Matrix; Peter Zizzo

Avril Lavigne chronology
Let Go (2002)	Avril Lavigne: My World (2003)

Singles from Let Go
- 1. "Complicated" Released: 11 March 2002; 2. "Sk8er Boi" Released: 9 September 2002; 3. "I'm with You" Released: 18 November 2002; 4. "Losing Grip" Released: 24 March 2003; 5. "Mobile" Released: 8 May 2003

Let Go is the debut album by the Canadian singer-songwriter Avril Lavigne, released on 4 June 2002, by Arista Records. Critics have described Let Go as a pop-punk and alternative rock album with a grunge-oriented sound. The album sold over 16 million copies worldwide, making it Lavigne's highest-selling album and the best selling album of the 21st century by a Canadian artist.

Upon release, Let Go received generally positive reviews from music critics. The album was credited as the biggest pop debut of 2002. According to Billboard, the album was the 21st-best-selling album of the decade. It was certified 7× Platinum by the Recording Industry Association of America (RIAA) in the United States, and it received a Diamond certification from Music Canada. The album reached multi-Platinum certification in many countries around the world, including the UK, in which she became the youngest female solo artist to have a number-one album in the region. The album was further promoted by the Try to Shut Me Up Tour between December 2002 and June 2003. The album and its singles earned Lavigne eight Grammy Award nominations including Best New Artist, twice for Song of the Year, and Best Pop Vocal Album.

Widely regarded as one of the most influential albums of the early 2000s, Let Go is credited with helping integrate pop-punk into the mainstream and contributing to the rise of both female-fronted pop-punk acts and female singer-songwriters, marking a shift away from the bubblegum pop sound that had dominated the era. A Rolling Stone readers' poll named Let Go the fourth best album of the 2000s. On 18 March 2013, Let Go was re-released as a double disc-set paired with her second album, Under My Skin, which is released under RCA Records.

== Background ==
In November 2000, Ken Krongard, an A&R representative, invited Antonio "L.A." Reid, then head of Arista Records, to producer Peter Zizzo's Manhattan studio to hear Lavigne sing. Her 15-minute audition "so impressed" Reid that he immediately signed her to Arista with a deal worth $1.25 million for two albums and an extra $900,000 for a publishing advance. By this time, Lavigne had found that she fit in naturally with her hometown high school's skater clique, an image that carried through to her first album, but although she enjoyed skateboarding, school left her feeling insecure. Armed with a record deal, she dropped out to focus on her music career, but she still had to inform her parents of her decision. "I wasn't going to turn [the record deal] down. It's been my dream all my life. They knew how much I wanted this and how much I've put into it."

Lavigne relocated to Los Angeles, where she collaborated with songwriter and producer Clif Magness, who gave her ample creative control in the writing process. Lavigne and Magness wrote "Losing Grip" and "Unwanted", songs that she deemed reflective of her vision for the entire album. However, Arista was not thrilled with the heavy-guitar laden songs that Lavigne was writing, prompting the label to look for other producers to match their demands.

Now two years since she signed the deal, Lavigne, who was then unknown, came to the attention of the three-piece production team the Matrix. Arista could not find the right direction for Lavigne, so the team's manager, Sandy Roberton, suggested that they work together: "Why don't you put her together with the Matrix for a couple of days?" According to member Lauren Christy, they had been listening to Lavigne's early songs and felt they contained "a Faith Hill kind of vibe". As soon as they saw Lavigne coming into their studio, the Matrix felt that her musical direction was incongruous to her image and attitude. After talking to Lavigne for an hour, "we cottoned on that she wasn't happy but couldn't quite figure out where to go." The Matrix played her songs with Faith Hill influences, because these were the kinds of songs the label wanted Lavigne to sing. But Lavigne dismissed it, saying she wanted songs with punk rock inclinations. Lavigne played the Matrix a song that she had recorded and really loved, a track with sounds evocative of the rock band System of a Down. Fortunately, prior to forming the Matrix, its members' early projects were in the pop-rock vein, so they readily figured out what Lavigne wanted to record and knew exactly what to do with her. They told her to come back the following day. In the meantime, they wrote a song that evolved into "Complicated" and another song called "Falling Down" (which appears on the Sweet Home Alabama soundtrack). They played these for Lavigne when she returned the following day; the songs ultimately allowed her to visualize the path she should take.

When Josh Sarubin, the A&R executive who signed Lavigne to the imprint, heard "Complicated", he knew it was right for her. Lavigne presented the song to Reid, who approved of the musical direction Lavigne and the Matrix were taking, and set "Complicated" as the album's lead single. Reid sent Lavigne back to the Matrix to work with them, initially for a month. Arista gave the team carte blanche to write and produce ten songs, which took them two months. The album was originally titled Anything but Ordinary, after the track of the same name that the Matrix produced, but Lavigne asked Reid for the album to be called Let Go instead.

The album cover was taken in Manhattan, New York City at the intersection of Broadway and Canal Street. In 2022, Lavigne visited the same place and recreated the cover in a short video for the 20th anniversary of the album.

== Writing and recording ==
With the Matrix, Lavigne recorded tracks in Decoy Studios, situated in a Los Angeles suburb known as Valley Village. She also worked with producer-songwriter Curt Frasca and Peter Zizzo, whose Manhattan studio Lavigne was checked in prior to securing a record deal with Arista, and where Lavigne also recorded some of the tracks. The Matrix member Scott Spock was their principal engineer for the project, while Tom Lord-Alge was assigned to mix the tracks. Lavigne recorded complete takes "against the largely finished instrumental tracks". Spocks revealed Lavigne normally recorded each song in five or six takes, "and probably 90 percent of what was finally used came from the first or second takes." The Matrix also contributed backing vocals.

Introduced as a singer-songwriter, Lavigne's involvement produced significant issues. Lavigne has implied that she is the primary author of the album. In an article published in Rolling Stone magazine, Lavigne stated that while working with the Matrix, one member would be in the recording studio while they were writing, but did not write the guitar parts, lyrics, or the melody. According to Lavigne, she and Christy wrote all the lyrics together. Graham would come up with some guitar parts, "and I'd be like, 'Yeah, I like that,' or 'No, I don't like that.' None of those songs aren't from me."

The Matrix, who produced six songs for Lavigne, five of which appear in the album, had another explanation of how the collaboration went. According to them, they wrote much of the portions in the three singles: "Complicated", "Sk8er Boi", and "I'm with You", which were conceived using a guitar and piano. Christy said, "Avril would come in and sing a few melodies, change a word here or there." Reid complemented the issue over the credits: "If I'm looking for a single for an artist, I don't care who writes it. Avril had the freedom to do as she really pleased, and the songs show her point of view. ... Avril has always been confident about her ideas."

Although she needed pop songs "to break" into the industry, Lavigne felt "Complicated" does not reflect her and her songwriting skills. Nonetheless, she was grateful for the song because it successfully launched her career. She favours more "Losing Grip", because "it means so much more when it comes straight from the artist".

== Musical style ==
Let Go was heralded as a pop-punk gem, the album is considered to have transformed the pop-punk music scene, integrating the genre to the mainstream and contributing to the rise of female-driven, punk-influenced pop music. Let Go has also been described as alternative rock, pop rock, post-grunge and mainstream rock, with elements of pop and grunge. Clare Gehlich of The Statesman said the album blends pop-punk, alternative rock and teen pop, musical genres that distinguished her work from those of her peers at the time. Additionally, Loudwire stated that the album represented scene music. Lyrically, it explores themes such as self-expression, resilience and empowerment.

The album contains a variety of musical influences. Pitchfork observed in 2018 that Let Go "boasts a handful of genre-changing smashes and mood swings that’d put a high school sophomore to shame." The diversity came partly from Lavigne's wide-ranging interests, and partly because her label and producers were pushing her in different directions. The five songs she wrote with Magness in 2001, including "Losing Grip" and "Unwanted", had a hard-rocking alternative sound which worried her label. Lavigne told Rolling Stone in 2003 that "Arista was drop-dead shit afraid that I would come out with a whole album" sounding like these songs; they wanted her to go in a more radio-friendly direction. For this purpose, Arista assigned her the production team the Matrix, who wrote the pop rock song "Complicated" with minor help from Lavigne. Half the album was co-written with the Matrix, and the other half with Magness. Sarah Manavis of The Guardian said some of Lavigne's early country influences, and her original artistic direction, can still be heard in some of the album's "twangy cadences and narrative storytelling".

== Release and promotion ==
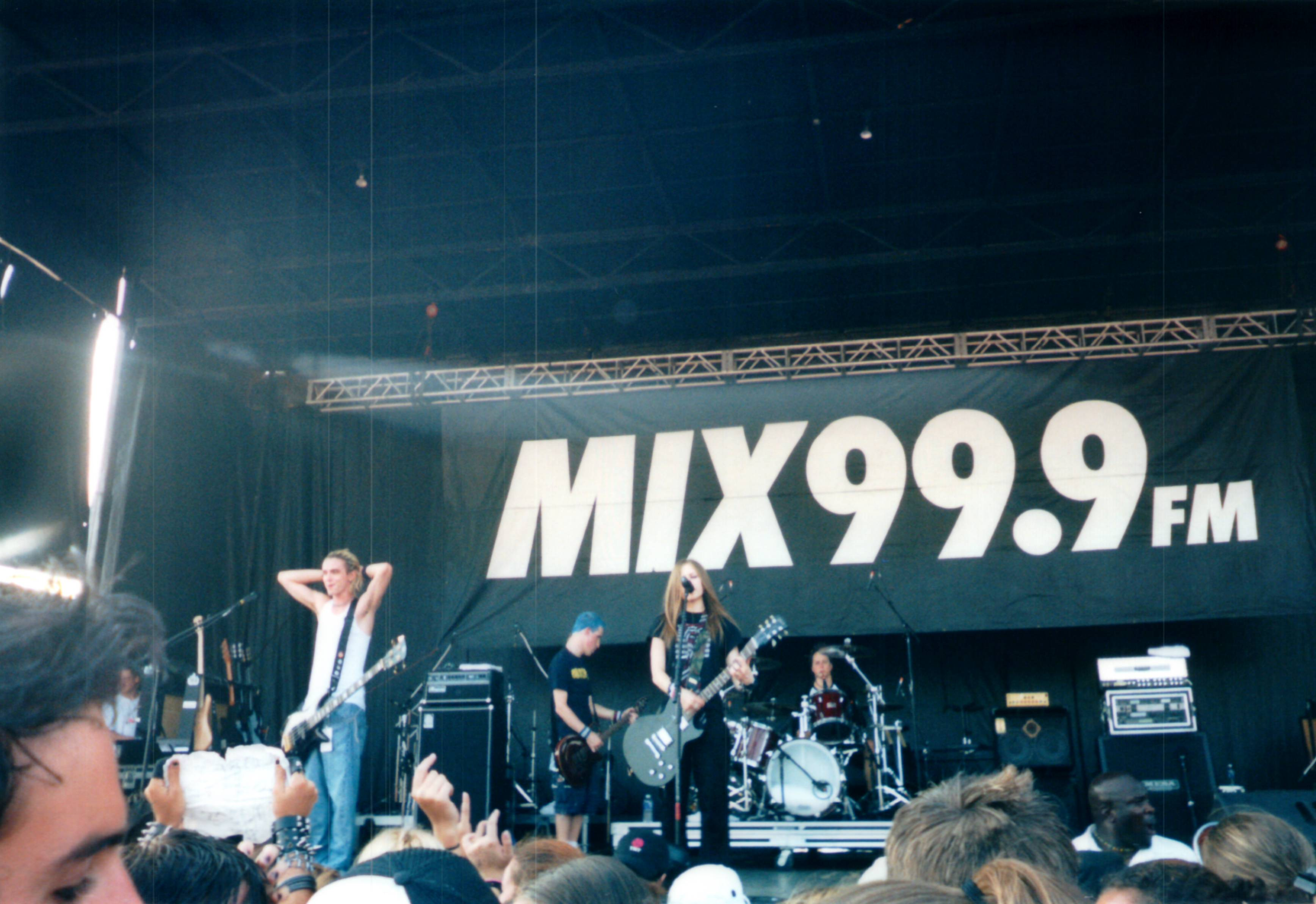
Lavigne in concert for the album's promotion

The album was released on 4 June 2002, in Canada and the United States. Later, on 22 July, Let Go hit record stores worldwide, and on 26 August in some parts of Europe, including the United Kingdom and Ireland. A DataPlay version of the album was released in September 2002. Arista had established a deal with DataPlay earlier in 2002 and included Let Go alongside albums by rock singer Santana and singer Whitney Houston in the release.

Although Lavigne was targeted to the teen audience, a marketing strategy credited with the successful launch of her career; Lavigne performed on a host of radio-sponsored multi-artist holiday shows throughout the United States, a marketing strategy that induced higher sales of the album during the season. She embarked on her first headlining tour, the Try to Shut Me Up Tour, which took place on 23 January 2003, and ended on 4 June 2003. Lavigne toured with her band—drummer Matthew Brann, bassist Mark Spicoluk, and guitarists Jesse Colburn and Evan Taubenfeld—which she had grouped after signing the deal. In the tour, she included all songs off Let Go, and cover versions of "Knockin' on Heaven's Door" by Bob Dylan and "Basket Case" by Green Day.

Lavigne filmed her performance in Buffalo, New York, on 18 May 2003, the final date of her five-week headlining North American tour. The tour DVD My World was released on 4 November 2003, on joint venture by Arista Records and 20th Century Fox Home Entertainment. The DVD features the concert, a behind-the-scenes featurette, five music videos and a six-song bonus audio CD that includes an unreleased track "Why".

=== Singles ===
"Complicated" was released by Arista as the album's lead single, which was seen as an across-all-age-groups introduction to Lavigne. Thought to produce wide cross-demographic appeal, however, the music video for the single features Lavigne and her band wreaking havoc in a mall, "the sort of imagery that might have grown-ups thinking 'Clean that mess up!' more than clamoring for the record." The song topped the charts in several countries and was nominated for two Grammy Awards for Song of the Year and Best Female Pop Vocal Performance.

The second single, "Sk8er Boi", was aimed at pop-punk-oriented kids. The release of "Sk8er Boi" created disagreement among many radio programming directors. However, their impressions were diverted as listeners helped change their minds; early rotation of the single proved successful, showing it was as popular with post-collegiate listeners as with teens. The song reached number one on US mainstream radio.

"I'm with You" was released in late November 2002, close to Christmas holidays to remind parents about the album to, if not to buy it themselves, to purchase it for any children in their family. The song became another success for Lavigne reaching number four in the Billboard Hot 100, number one on mainstream radio and the top 10 in the UK and Canada. It was not officially released in Australia but received radio and television airplay. To date, Let Go is Lavigne's only album to produce multiple top-ten singles in the US. The song was also nominated for two Grammy Awards the same categories as "Complicated". The release arrangement of the album's singles, with "I'm with You" being served as the third, was regarded as "controversial", given that "I'm with You" was "thought by some to be the biggest potential smash on the album", and could have established Lavigne as a more mature artist if it was released first. According to Reid, "Some people just really didn't get that. And with the first video, there was some concern that maybe because it's so young and so playful, it might alienate more serious music lovers."

"Losing Grip" was released as the fourth single from the album, "to act as a bridge into her next album", which Lavigne stated would be "harder-rocking" than her debut. In 2004, it was nominated for the Grammy Award for Best Female Rock Vocal Performance.

"Mobile" was released in New Zealand in May 2003, as the fifth single. It was later used in 2003's The Medallion, the 2004 film Wimbledon, and a brief appearance in the film Just Married. In 2011, a music video for the song leaked onto the Internet made from official footage that was never finished.

=== 20th anniversary edition ===
A new edition of Let Go, newly remixed by John Feldmann, was released on 3 June 2022, to coincide with the 20th anniversary of the original album's release.

A new recording of "Breakaway" is featured on the re-release. Lavigne originally wrote the song in 2001, then passed it to American singer Kelly Clarkson who recorded it for The Princess Diaries 2: Royal Engagement soundtrack. The original demo version by Lavigne had previously leaked online in 2014.

== Critical reception ==
Professional ratings
Aggregate scores
Source	Rating
Metacritic	68/100
Review scores
Source	Rating
AllMusic	5/5 stars
Blender	4/5 stars
Entertainment Weekly	B−
Melodic	2.5/5 stars
Pitchfork	6.6/10
Q	3/5 stars
Robert Christgau	(choice cut)
Rolling Stone	3/5 stars
Slant Magazine	2.5/5 stars
Stylus Magazine	B

Let Go received mostly positive reviews from critics, earning a metascore of 68 over 100 on Metacritic, which is based on the collated reviews from 9 publications. Rolling Stone magazine's music critic Pat Blashill wrote that the album "comes fully loaded with another dozen infectious hymns of Total Request angst". Blashill complimented Lavigne on having a "great voice", adding she crafted the album with "a qualified staff of hitmakers". Christina Saraceno of AllMusic noted that Lavigne "handles a variety of styles deftly", while also complimenting her as "a capable songwriter with vocal chops". Nonetheless, Saraceno opined that "at her age, one imagines, she is still finding her feet, borrowing from the music she's grown up listening to". John Perry of Blender magazine summarized Let Go into an "outstanding guitar-pop debut". A review in Q magazine praised Lavigne for displaying "a musical guile way beyond her years". Kaj Roth of Melodic felt that Lavigne "sings lovely and some of the songs goes in the Alanis Morissette [sic] vein". For Jon Caramanica of Entertainment Weekly magazine (who gave the album a B−), "Lavigne's monochromatic debut set of unimaginative guitar rock is saved only by the earnestness of her songs."

Some reviewers had similar sentiments toward the quality of the lyrics to some songs in the album. Saraceno said that Lavigne "still has some growing up to do lyrically", asserting "Sk8er Boi" shows her "lyrical shortcomings" and calling the phrasing in "Too Much to Ask" "awkward and sometimes silly". Perry noted the lyrics to "Sk8er Boi" as "endearingly naive". Some critics also argued that the album was not as angsty or authentic as it was claiming to be.

=== Accolades ===
The album earned Lavigne numerous awards from organizations around the world. The success of the album's commercial performance led Lavigne to be named Best New Artist at the 2002 MTV Video Music Awards. She won three awards—Favorite Female Artist, Favorite Breakthrough Artist, and the Style Award—the most of any performer at the 2003 MTV Asia Awards. She received five nominations for the album at the 2003 Grammy Awards, including Best New Artist and Best Pop Vocal Album. The album's singles "Complicated" and "I'm with You" were nominated Song of the Year at the 2003 and 2004 ceremony, respectively, accumulating eight nominations for the album. Lavigne was nominated for six categories at the 2003 Juno Awards—which were presented in Ottawa—winning four including Best Album and Best New Artist.

Awards for Let Go
Year	Organization	Award	Result	Ref.
2002	Radio Disney Music Awards	Best Album	Won	
2003	Grammy Awards	Best Pop Vocal Album	Nominated	
2003	Hong Kong Top Sales Music Awards	Top Ten Best Selling Foreign Albums	Won	
2003	Hungarian Music Awards	Foreign Modern Rock Album of the Year	Nominated	
2003	Japan Gold Disc Award	Rock & Pop Album of the Year	Won	
2003	Juno Awards	Album of the Year	Won	
2003	Juno Awards	Pop Album of the Year	Won	
2003	MTV Video Music Awards Japan	Album of the Year	Nominated	
2003	Premios Oye!	Main English Female Record	Won	
2003	Teen Choice Awards	Choice Music: Album	Nominated	

== Commercial performance ==
Let Go was commercially successful in the United States, gaining praise from Entertainment Weekly magazine as one of the biggest pop debut albums of 2002. According to Billboard, as of 2022, Let Go is one of the 15 best-performing 21st-century albums without any of its singles being number-one hits on the Billboard Hot 100. The album debuted on the Billboard 200 at number eight on the strength of 62,000-unit sales and later peaked at number two. Its high debut was fuelled by the success of "Complicated", which was in heavy rotation on MTV. Increasing weekly sales allowed the album to stay inside the chart's top 10 for 37 weeks. The album sold at least 100,000 copies every week straight until late 2002, easily accumulating over 2-million-unit sales. In a December 2002 report by Entertainment Weekly magazine, it was stated that the album had sold 3.9 million copies, becoming the third top-selling album of 2002 in the United States. Year-end figures released by Nielsen SoundScan revealed that Let Go had sold over 4.1 million copies in the United States, accumulated in 30 weeks of the album's release. Let Go was certified double Platinum by the Recording Industry Association of America. This earned Let Go the distinction of being the highest-shipped debut of 2002 and best-selling album by a female artist. On 30 April 2003, the RIAA certified the album six-times Platinum, denoting shipments of over six million units. It remains Lavigne's best-selling album to date, with 6.9 million copies sold in the United States and over 16 million worldwide.

Chartwise, the album reached higher peak positions notably during and after the holidays. Following her show-opening performance at the 2002 Billboard Music Awards, Let Go continued to be one of the holiday's top sellers with sales that week of 272,000. It reached its highest sales week on the issue dated 4 January 2003, with 363,000 copies sold. Although it had peaked at number two in September 2002, Let Go rose from three to two on the Billboard 200 on the issue dated 1 February 2003. The increase of sales was the offshoot to Lavigne's appearance on 11 January in Saturday Night Live as the show's musical guest. There were accusations of lip-synching but in an interview at the time she tells she has never lip-sung or ever plans to. During this time also, Lavigne received much media coverage due to her nominations at the 2003 Grammy Awards and for embarking on her first North American tour. In the United Kingdom, the album took longer to reach the summit of the UK Albums Chart. In its 18th week of release, reached on the chart year 2003, the album hit number one, rising to the top spot over the holiday, making Lavigne breaking a record becoming the youngest female singer to top the chart at 17 years and nine months old. However, the record was broken by Joss Stone in October 2004, when her album Mind Body & Soul debuted at number one on the UK Albums Chart when she was 17 years and five months old.

The album's international sales upsurge was attributed to the continuing success of "Sk8er Boi". Let Go is the 12th best-selling album of 2003 in the United Kingdom. The album has been certified six-times Platinum by the British Phonographic Industry.

Let Go was also selling well in Canada, surpassing sales of over one-million-unit sales in less than a year. The Canadian Recording Industry Association certified the album Diamond in May 2003. In Australia, Let Go had been certified seven-times Platinum by the Australian Recording Industry Association in 2003, based on the sales of over 490,000 units from wholesalers to retailers.

== Impact and legacy ==
Let Go is regarded as a defining album in early 2000s pop and pop rock music, offering an alternative to the dominant teen pop sound of the time period. According to CBC.ca, the album's fusion of genres appealed to a broad audience and contributed to the growing popularity of pop-punk among younger listeners. Izzy Copestake of Vice noted that the album resonated particularly strongly with millennials. Charlotte Oliver of Heat said the tracks' seamless blending of mainstream pop and alternative rock made them accessible to fans of both. Its commercial success demonstrated strong demand for Lavigne’s sound, while prompting a genre debate over whether Let Go qualified as punk, pop-punk, or mainstream rock. The singer has stated that she never described herself as punk artist, calling the designation a label she had been given by the public. Retrospectively, some music publications have ranked it among the greatest debut albums. One such outlet, CBC Music, said Lavigne's debut followed in the footsteps of Alanis Morisette, Sarah McLachlan, Celine Dion, and Shania Twain by proving that "Canadian women could make some of the bestselling albums in mainstream pop music". Rolling Stone ranked Let Go the 225th best album of the 21st century, and the Toronto Star named it one of the most important Canadian albums of the 2000s.

Lavigne’s snarky attitude, grungy look and alternative-inspired sound was a potent combination that elevated Let Go above the rest of the pop pack. Almost overnight, girls all over the world began to swap choker necklaces for men’s neckwear, body glitter for leather bracelets, and denim for cargo pants. Her videos, featuring Lavigne trashing malls and skating with groups of boys, were watched obsessively. Let Go unleashed an army of seven to 15-year-olds brimming with ennui, desperate to remake themselves in Lavigne’s image.

— The Guardian critic Sarah Manavis, on Let Go's immediate impact.

The album is considered to be one of the works that transformed the pop-punk music scene, helping integrate the genre into the mainstream by contributing to the rise of female-driven pop-punk bands and music. It ultimately contributed to reshaping the sound of pop music, with Matt Mitchell of Paste saying it "cemented the rock revival of the 2000s as an unbreakable, undeniable monolith of excellence". Apple Music wrote that, in retrospect, Let Go's legacy extends beyond "pushing alt-rock further into the pop space ... it's the way Lavigne balanced her angsty side ... with the drama and sensitivity of a conventional singer-songwriter". The album's genres distinguished Lavigne from peers such as Britney Spears, Christina Aguilera, and NSYNC, and the bubblegum pop music that dominated radio at the time. However, it also drew criticism from some purists who questioned Lavigne's authenticity and accused her of posing. Regarded as a style icon, Lavigne's signature skater-punk fashion throughout the album cycle was widely imitated by fans, who embraced it as an antithesis to the glamorous, hyperfeminine, and sexualized image that was then considered the industry standard for young female artists. AllMusic biographer Andrew Leahey said she emerged as "a new kind of superstar, one whose appeal didn't rely on sexy videos or suggestive music". The album and Lavigne's rebellious public persona led to media publications nicknaming her the "Pop Punk Princess" since her early career.

Let Go established Lavigne as a cultural phenomenon and mainstream female artist in a male-dominated genre. Although Lavigne was not the first act to cultivate the sound, her debut album's success informed the musical directions of artists such as Liz Phair, Ashlee Simpson, Kelly Clarkson, FeFe Dobson, Lindsay Lohan, Katy Rose, Skye Sweetnam, and Fall Out Boy. Billboard's Jonathan Bradley observed that Disney Channel stars Hilary Duff, Miley Cyrus, and Demi Lovato each channeled Let Go over the output of Spears, Aguilera, and Justin Timberlake when they were first transitioning from acting to music careers. Richie Assaly of the Toronto Star said the album "helped pave the way for a wave of popular pop-punk bands like Simple Plan and Good Charlotte", and Exclaim!'s Ian Gormley said it replaced teen pop's reign" with "an era of female singer-songwriter influenced pop" and "a new generation of young artists". In the decades since its release, Let Go has been cited by various artists as a musical influence, and is retrospectively considered to be part of a broader movement that returned guitar-driven pop to mainstream focus. The album has inspired the works of contemporary artists such as Olivia Rodrigo, Billie Eilish, Maggie Lindemann, Beabadoobee, Snail Mail, and Soccer Mommy. Let Go also played a significant role in launching The Matrix’s career, helping establish the trio as sought-after producers and songwriters for other major artists. They often reused Let Go's formula, which Pitchfork's Jamieson Cox described as "clean, spiky riffs, punchy live drums, sparkling background atmospherics". However, they did not collaborate with Lavigne again after Let Go, with the end of their working relationship attributed to creative differences and disagreements over the extent of Lavigne's songwriting contributions.

To commemorate its 20th anniversary in 2022, CBC Music featured commentary from 15 musicians and writers reflecting on the album's cultural relevance. In 2023, the track "Tomorrow" was featured in HBO's adaption of The Last of Us. In 2024, Clare Gehlich of The Statesman observed that the resurgence of 2000s culture and pop-punk music highlights the "enduring impact" of the album, which she believes transcended debut album status by continuing to "shape the musical landscape two decades after its release". Per Manavis, its 20th anniversary coincided with "a reappraisal of Y2K culture by a generation too young to remember it". Similarly, Aimee Phillips of Gigwise mentioned that the album "captured the teenage world so succinctly that it still resonates to this day, proving that it wasn’t just a millennial album but one that has penetrated Gen Z’s consciousness too".

== Track listing ==
Original release
No.	Title	Writer(s)	Producer(s)	Length
1.	"Losing Grip"	Avril Lavigne; Clif Magness	Magness	3:53
2.	"Complicated"	Lavigne; Lauren Christy; Scott Spock; Graham Edwards	The Matrix	4:05
3.	"Sk8er Boi"	Lavigne; Christy; Spock; Edwards	The Matrix	3:23
4.	"I'm with You"	Lavigne; Christy; Spock; Edwards	The Matrix	3:44
5.	"Mobile"	Lavigne; Magness	Magness	3:31
6.	"Unwanted"	Lavigne; Magness	Magness	3:40
7.	"Tomorrow"	Lavigne; Curt Frasca; Sabelle Breer	Frasca	3:48
8.	"Anything but Ordinary"	Lavigne; Christy; Spock; Edwards	The Matrix	4:12
9.	"Things I'll Never Say"	Lavigne; Christy; Spock; Edwards	The Matrix	3:44
10.	"My World"	Lavigne; Magness	Magness	3:27
11.	"Nobody's Fool"	Lavigne; Peter Zizzo	Zizzo	3:57
12.	"Too Much to Ask"	Lavigne; Magness	Magness	3:46
13.	"Naked"	Lavigne; Frasca; Breer	Frasca; Magness	3:27
Total length:				48:37

Japanese edition (bonus track)
No.	Title	Writer(s)	Producer(s)	Length
14.	"Why"	Lavigne; Zizzo	Zizzo	4:00
Total length:				52:37

Japanese special edition (bonus tracks)
No.	Title	Length
15.	"Complicated" (TV track version)	4:05
16.	"Sk8er Boi" (TV track version)	3:24
17.	"I'm with You" (TV track version)	3:46
18.	"Losing Grip" (TV track version)	3:53
Total length:		67:45

20th anniversary edition bonus tracks
No.	Title	Writer(s)	Producer(s)	Length
14.	"Why"	Lavigne; Zizzo	Zizzo	3:54
15.	"Get over It"	Lavigne; Christy; Spock; Edwards	The Matrix	3:29
16.	"Breakaway"	Lavigne; Bridget Benenate; Matthew Gerrard	Dylan McLean; John Feldmann; Gerrard; Scot Stewart	3:44
17.	"Falling Down" (from the Sweet Home Alabama soundtrack)	Lavigne; Christy; Spock; Edwards	The Matrix	3:58
18.	"I Don't Give" (from the American Wedding soundtrack)	Lavigne; Christy; Spock; Edwards	The Matrix	3:39
19.	"Make Up"	Lavigne; Christy; Spock; Edwards	The Matrix	3:15
Total length:				70:49

Japanese limited tour edition (bonus DVD)
No.	Title	Length
1.	"Complicated" (video)
2.	"Sk8er Boi" (video)
3.	"I'm with You" (video)
4.	"A Day in the Life – N.Y.C." (EPK)

Asian tour edition (bonus disc)
No.	Title	Length
1.	"Get over It" (audio)
2.	"Why" (audio)
3.	"Unwanted" (live audio)
4.	"I'm with You" (live audio)
5.	"Nobody's Fool" (live audio)
6.	"Exclusive Behind-the-Scenes Footage" (video)
7.	"Complicated" (video)
8.	"Sk8er Boi" (video)
9.	"I'm with You" (video)
10.	"Losing Grip" (video)

Notes

- ^{^[a]}The thirteen standard edition tracks, track 15 and tracks 17–19 are remastered with additional remixing by John Feldmann, for the 20th Anniversary Edition.
- "Why" is an alternate take on the original that both versions were recorded in 2002 with the alternate take being put on the "20th Anniversary Edition".
- "Breakaway" is a new recording on the 20th Anniversary Edition, while the other songs retain their original recording session.
- The standard thirteen tracks on the 20th anniversary edition are similar or different lengths than the original mixes on the standard edition.

== Personnel ==
Credits adapted from the liner notes of Let Go.

Musicians

- Avril Lavigne – lead vocals, background vocals (11), guitar (11)
- The Matrix – additional vocals (2–4, 8–9)
- Clif Magness – bass (1, 5–6, 10, 12–13), guitar (1, 5–6, 10, 12), keyboards (1, 5–6, 10, 12–13)
- Suzie Katayama – cello (4)
- Jeff Allen – bass (11)
- Joe Bonadio – drums (11)
- Josh Freese – drums (1, 5–6, 10, 12)
- Matthew Brann – drums (4)
- Alex Elena – drums (7, 13)
- Victor Indrizzo – drums (2–3)
- Gerry Leonard – guitar (11)
- Corky James – guitar (2–4, 8–9)
- Peter Zizzo – guitar (11)
- Curt Frasca – multi instruments (7), guitar (3)
- Dennis Johnson – beats and scratching (11)

Production

- The Matrix – production, arranging, and recording (2–4, 8–9)
- Clif Magness – producer (1, 5–6, 10, 12–13), programming (1, 5–6, 10), drum looping and sequencing (13)
- Curt Frasca – producer (7, 12–13), programming (13)
- Antonio "LA" Reid – executive producer
- Rick Kerr – engineer
- Leon Zervos – mastering
- Curt Frasca – producer (7, 12), programming (7)
- Peter Zizzo – producer, arranger, Pro-Tools editing, and programming (11)
- Jen Scaturro – Pro-Tools editing and programming (11)
- Avril Lavigne – art direction
- Tom Lord-Alge – mixing (1–9, 11)
- Randy Staub – mixing (10)
- David Leonard – mixing (12–13)
- Sabelle Breer – vocal arranger (7, and additional vocal production (7, 13)

== Charts ==
=== Weekly charts ===
Weekly chart performance for Let Go
Chart (2002–2003)	Peak position
Australian Albums (ARIA)	1
Austrian Albums (Ö3 Austria)	2
Belgian Albums (Ultratop Flanders)	7
Belgian Albums (Ultratop Wallonia)	9
Canadian Albums (Billboard)	1
Czech Albums (ČNS IFPI)	7
Danish Albums (Hitlisten)	6
Dutch Albums (Album Top 100)	4
European Albums (Music & Media)	2
Finnish Albums (Suomen virallinen lista)	9
French Albums (SNEP)	13
German Albums (Offizielle Top 100)	2
Greek Albums (IFPI)	2
Hungarian Albums (MAHASZ)	11
Irish Albums (IRMA)	1
Italian Albums (FIMI)	6
Japanese Albums (Oricon) (Note: The standard edition and the Japanese limited edition peaked at number six on the Japanese chart, while the special bonus edition peaked at number 28 and the Japanese edition at number 241.)	6
New Zealand Albums (RMNZ)	1
Norwegian Albums (VG-lista)	3
Polish Albums (ZPAV)	23
Portuguese Albums (AFP)	10
Scottish Albums (Official Charts)	1
Singaporean Albums (RIAS)	1
Spanish Albums (AFYVE)	17
Swedish Albums (Sverigetopplistan)	6
Swiss Albums (Schweizer Hitparade)	2
UK Albums (Official Charts)	1
US Billboard 200	2

=== Year-end charts ===
2002 year-end chart performance for Let Go
Chart (2002)	Position
Australian Albums (ARIA)	10
Austrian Albums (Ö3 Austria)	26
Belgian Albums (Ultratop Flanders)	40
Belgian Albums (Ultratop Wallonia)	65
Canadian Albums (Nielsen SoundScan)	4
Canadian Alternative Albums (Nielsen SoundScan)	2
Danish Albums (Hitlisten)	30
Dutch Albums (Album Top 100)	58
European Albums (Music & Media)	23
Finnish Albums (Suomen virallinen lista)	29
French Albums (SNEP)	80
German Albums (Offizielle Top 100)	30
Irish Albums (IRMA)	12
Italian Albums (FIMI)	29
Japanese Albums (Oricon)	49
New Zealand Albums (RMNZ)	24
Swedish Albums (Sverigetopplistan)	42
Swedish Albums & Compilations (Sverigetopplistan)	55
Swiss Albums (Schweizer Hitparade)	18
UK Albums (OCC)	16
US Billboard 200	14
Worldwide Albums (IFPI)	2

2003 year-end chart performance for Let Go
Chart (2003)	Position
Australian Albums (ARIA)	3
Austrian Albums (Ö3 Austria)	34
Belgian Albums (Ultratop Flanders)	26
Belgian Albums (Ultratop Wallonia)	31
Danish Albums (Hitlisten)	55
Dutch Albums (Album Top 100)	38
European Albums (Billboard)	5
French Albums (SNEP)	38
German Albums (Offizielle Top 100)	20
Hungarian Albums (MAHASZ)	82
Irish Albums (IRMA)	13
Italian Albums (FIMI)	39
Japanese Albums (Oricon)	26
New Zealand Albums (RMNZ)	18
South Korean International Albums (MIAK)	1
Swedish Albums (Sverigetopplistan)	92
Swiss Albums (Schweizer Hitparade)	35
UK Albums (OCC)	11
US Billboard 200	5
Worldwide Albums (IFPI)	9

=== Decade-end charts ===
Decade-end chart performance for Let Go
Chart (2000–2009)	Position
Australian Albums (ARIA)	14
Japanese Albums (Oricon)	75
UK Albums (OCC)	40
US Billboard 200	21

== Certifications and sales ==
Certifications and sales for Let Go
Region	Certification	Certified units/sales
Argentina (CAPIF)	3× Platinum	120,000^{^}
Australia (ARIA)	7× Platinum	490,000^{^}
Austria (IFPI Austria)	Platinum	30,000^{*}
Belgium (BRMA)	Gold	25,000^{*}
Brazil (Pro-Música Brasil)	2× Platinum	250,000^{*}
Canada (Music Canada)	Diamond	1,000,000^{^}
Denmark (IFPI Danmark)	3× Platinum	60,000^{‡}
Finland (Musiikkituottajat)	Gold	16,256
France (SNEP)	Platinum	300,000^{*}
Germany (BVMI)	3× Gold	450,000^{^}
Greece (IFPI Greece)	Gold	15,000^{^}
Hungary (MAHASZ)	Gold	10,000^{^}
Italy (FIMI) sales since 2009	Gold	25,000^{‡}
Japan (RIAJ)	Million	1,300,000
Netherlands (NVPI)	Platinum	80,000^{^}
New Zealand (RMNZ)	5× Platinum	75,000^{^}
Norway (IFPI Norway)	Platinum	50,000^{*}
Poland (ZPAV)	Gold	20,000^{*}
Portugal (AFP)	Gold	20,000^{^}
Singapore (RIAS)	Gold	5,000^{*}
South Korea	—	209,459 (Note: In South Korea, "Let Go" sold 177,731 copies until May 2003, and the repackaged version of the album sold 31,728 copies until August 2003.)
Spain (Promusicae)	Platinum	100,000^{^}
Sweden (GLF)	Platinum	60,000^{^}
Switzerland (IFPI Switzerland)	2× Platinum	80,000^{^}
United Kingdom (BPI)	6× Platinum	1,800,000^{‡}
United States (RIAA)	7× Platinum	7,000,000^{‡}
Summaries
Europe (IFPI)	2× Platinum	2,000,000^{*}
Worldwide	—	16,000,000
^{*} Sales figures based on certification alone.^{^} Shipments figures based on certification alone.^{‡} Sales+streaming figures based on certification alone.
