= Sk8er Boi =

2002 single by Avril Lavigne

- US promotional CD cover

Single by Avril Lavigne

from the album Let Go
- A-side: "I'm with You" (DVD single)
- B-side: "Get over It"
- Released: September 9, 2002
- Studio: Decoy (Valley Village); Real Music (Los Angeles); South Beach (Miami)
- Genre: Pop punk
- Length: 3:23
- Label: Arista
- Songwriters: Avril Lavigne; Lauren Christy; Scott Spock; Graham Edwards
- Producer: The Matrix

Avril Lavigne singles chronology
"Complicated" (2002)	"Sk8er Boi" (2002)	"I'm with You" (2002)

Music video
- "Sk8er Boi" on YouTube

"Sk8er Boi" (pronounced "skater boy") is a song by Canadian singer-songwriter Avril Lavigne from her debut studio album, Let Go (2002). Following her signing with Arista Records, Lavigne co-wrote the song with the production team the Matrix and was inspired by her high school experiences. A pop punk track, "Sk8er Boi" tells the story of a ballerina who refuses to date a skater because of the social stigma of his subculture, but regrets her decision when he becomes a rock star.

Despite some internal debate about its suitability as a single, "Sk8er Boi" was released by Arista to radio as the second single from Let Go on September 9, 2002 in the United States. It reached number 10 on the Billboard Hot 100 chart and was certified 3× Platinum by the Recording Industry Association of America (RIAA). The track reached the top ten and achieved Platinum certification in Australia, New Zealand, and the United Kingdom. Critics in both contemporary and retrospective reviews praised the song for its high-energy production and Lavigne's ability to appeal to young people.

The music video was directed by Francis Lawrence and premiered on MTV's Total Request Live on August 22, 2002. It shows Lavigne performing an impromptu concert at a Los Angeles intersection. The video was nominated for Best Pop Video at the 2003 MTV Video Music Awards. "Sk8er Boi" has been included in the set list of all of Lavigne's major headlining concert tours; it has been covered by numerous artists and appeared in television shows and video games. It was nominated for Best Female Rock Vocal Performance at the 45th Annual Grammy Awards.

== Background and release ==
In November 2000, Canadian singer Avril Lavigne signed a recording contract with the label Arista Records, headed by Antonio "L.A." Reid, and started to collaborate with a team of songwriters for her debut studio album, Let Go (2002). She worked with the Matrix, a production team made up of Lauren Christy, Scott Spock, and Graham Edwards, to write and produce ten songs. During their first meeting, Lavigne turned down the Matrix's pop demos and requested harder rock material. After sending Lavigne to her hotel, the group wrote "Complicated" overnight, and "Sk8er Boi" and "I'm with You" soon followed as they worked together in the recording studio.

Lavigne wrote "Sk8er Boi" with the Matrix at Decoy Studios in Valley Village, California, inspired by her observations of people in high school and how they treated each other. Having been a skateboarder herself, she explained that her delivery in the song was "a bit girly" because she had a crush on skateboarders and rock stars. The Matrix provided production, arrangement, recording, and additional vocals for "Sk8er Boi", assisted by Femio Hernandez. Corky James and Victor Indrizzo played guitar and drums, respectively. Mark Howard recorded the drums at Real Music Studios in Los Angeles, California, and Tom Lord-Alge mixed the track at South Beach Studios in Miami, Florida. A star is a visual symbol of the song; Lavigne stylized the title from "Skater Boy".

Following the lead single, "Complicated", "Sk8er Boi" was chosen as the second single from Let Go to target a teenage audience. As with the debate over the music video for "Complicated", executives at Arista feared that releasing "Sk8er Boi" would dissuade some of her audience from taking her seriously. These concerns were resolved by Lavigne's manager, Terry McBride of Nettwerk Music Group, who contended that the song distinguished Lavigne from other artists in her age group. Arista eventually released "Sk8er Boi" as a single, and the song was sent to mainstream, contemporary hit, and hot adult contemporary radio in the United States on September 9, 2002. A double-sided DVD single for "I'm with You" and "Sk8er Boi" was released on March 11, 2003, with an electronic press kit and a photo gallery. In 2022, a remastered version of "Sk8er Boi" was released on the 20th anniversary edition of Let Go. The song's CD B-side, "Get over It", was included on the anniversary edition. "Sk8er Boi" later appeared on Lavigne's 2024 compilation album Greatest Hits.

== Music and lyrics ==
"Sk8er Boi"
A sample of "Sk8er Boi" showing its "nouveau-punk" guitar chords and pop punk production. Lavigne considered the song more rock than pop.

"Sk8er Boi" is a pop punk song. (Note: Attributed to Leah Salterio of Philippine Daily Inquirer, Jon Pareles and Kelefa Sanneh of The New York Times, Stephen Daw of Billboard, Troy L. Smith of Cleveland.com, Alexis Petridis of The Guardian, and James Rettig of Stereogum.) Critics have also described the track as skate punk, punk rock, pop rock, alternative rock, rock and roll, new wave, and power pop. Lavigne considered the song closer to rock than pop. Pat Blashill of Rolling Stone characterized the song as having "nouveau-punk" guitar chords, and its chords are built around D_{5}, A_{5}, B_{5}, B♭_{5}, C_{5}, F_{5}, and D♭_{5}. The song tells the story of a preppy ballerina who rejects a skater to avoid the social stigma she would face with his subculture. She is worried about how her friends would react to seeing them together. Lavigne sets up the story in the opening verse by introducing a contrast between men and women and between social ranks. Despite slight differences between the choruses, each starts with: "He was a skater boy / She said, 'See you later, boy.'"

Five years later, the boy is a rock star, and the girl realizes she was wrong to judge him by appearances and follow her friends' opinions; at home, she is caring for her baby while watching him on MTV. Lavigne breaks the fourth wall in the final verse, portraying herself as the girlfriend of the skater boy: "I'm with the skater boy / I said, 'See you later, boy / I'll be backstage after the show / I'll be at a studio / Singing the song we wrote / About a girl you used to know.'" For Lavigne, the song's message is to "be true to yourself". In The Journal of Popular Culture, scholar Mark D. Pepper wrote that the story suggests "being yourself is only possible precisely because others think about and care about your selfhood". Caroline Sullivan of The Guardian compared the song to the style of Blondie.

== Critical reception ==
=== Contemporary ===
"Sk8er Boi" received positive reviews from contemporary music critics, who praised its youthful energy and Lavigne's appeal to young audiences. (Note: Attributed to John Perry of Blender, a People writer, Lindsay Merwin of Reading Eagle, John Young of Pittsburgh Post-Gazette, a Music Week writer, Todd Martens of Billboard, Mark Sutherland of The Times, and Sarah Boden of The Observer.) Several publications selected "Sk8er Boi" as a standout track on Let Go. (Note: Attributed to Nick Reynolds of the BBC, Lisa Verrico of The Times, Christina Saraceno of AllMusic, and Craig S. Semon of Telegram & Gazette.) Nick Reynolds of the BBC likened the "slick and clever" narrative of the song to that of an episode of Buffy the Vampire Slayer. Pat Blashill of Rolling Stone felt its style was the only one on Let Go "definable" beyond pop rock, calling it her defining moment as a 17-year-old and saying her voice could "[set] off car alarms several city blocks away". In its November 2002 issue, Spin recommended downloading the track, which it considered a reworked version of The Carpenters' "Superstar" (1971) produced for American Idol competitors.

A number of reviewers noted the song's adolescent point of view and its relatability. Blender's John Perry called the lyrics "endearingly naive", and a People writer stated that Lavigne embraced adolescence through the "charming punk attitude [of] youthful cuts" like "Sk8er Boi". Chuck Taylor of Billboard complimented its lively, "head-banging" qualities, while Lindsay Merwin of Reading Eagle and John Young of Pittsburgh Post-Gazette, respectively, observed its "singsongy" nature and the loud audience sing-along it inspired. Music Week anticipated that the single would help to maintain Lavigne's youth appeal following "Complicated". Todd Martens of Billboard proclaimed "Sk8er Boi" a "punky anthem", Mark Sutherland of The Times labelled it an "adolescent anthem", and Sarah Boden of The Observer named it a "radio-friendly skate anthem".

Some commentators considered the song's wider impact. According to Boden, "Sk8er Boi" helped Lavigne achieve "global superstar status". W's David A. Keeps wrote that along with "Complicated", the song characterized 21st-century adolescence by balancing naivety with sophistication. Nandini D'Souza, writing for the same magazine, noted that the song, alongside Lavigne's broader image, provided a stark contrast to the sexualized persona of contemporary pop idols. In a less positive review, The Guardian critic Andrew Mueller considered the song "duller than four courses of lettuce", while Dan Gennoe of Q felt it was a "dappy chugger" in which Lavigne portrays "slacker eye candy". Tom Gatti of The Times characterized the song as a skateboarder triumph narrative that "bizarrely" glorifies the hardships faced by single mothers.

=== Retrospective ===
"Sk8er Boi" was seen as a career-defining song for Lavigne, confirming that she was not a one-hit wonder. Retrospective reviews have continued to be positive. (Note: Attributed to Stephen Daw of Billboard, Troy L. Smith of Cleveland.com, and Mala Mortensa of Alternative Press.) Reviewing Let Go for Stereogum, James Rettig praised the song's underdog rock storyline and plot twists, noting that Lavigne's music was promoted as a counter to the hypersexualized teen pop industry of the early 2000s. Jamieson Cox of Pitchfork called "Sk8er Boi" Lavigne's "most pugnacious" song, though he noted its modest high school storytelling and its similarity to Taylor Swift's single "You Belong with Me" (2009).

Harrison Brocklehurst of The Tab said its storytelling is fable-like, classic, and folklorish for Millennials and Generation Z, like Swift's "Love Story" (2008). For American Songwriter, Jacob Uitti cited the song as instrumental in Lavigne's mainstream fame and success, while fellow writer Catherine Walthall said its longevity was due to her straightforward lyricism and teenage perspective. The Guardian's Alexis Petridis and Louder's Elizabeth Scarlett both highlighted the song's appeal to young audiences: Petridis praised its simple concept and narrative twist for tweens, while Scarlett noted that despite not being a true emo track, it connected with emo youths brooding over "failed romance". Mike Rampton at Kerrang! wrote that the song was a pop punk masterpiece about a tragic romance on a Shakespearean scale.

== Commercial performance ==
Following its US radio release, "Sk8er Boi" debuted on the Billboard Hot 100 at number 72 and peaked at number 10 on the chart dated November 2, 2002. It topped the Mainstream Top 40 radio chart and received a BDS Certified Spin Award from Nielsen Broadcast Data Systems for reaching 100,000 radio detections, as reported in the December 21, 2002, issue of Billboard. By 2024, the Recording Industry Association of America (RIAA) had certified "Sk8er Boi" 3× Platinum for 3,000,000 units sold, while the "I'm with You" and "Sk8er Boi" video single was certified Platinum in 2003 for 50,000 units. In Canada, the song peaked at number 29 on the digital songs chart, while it reached numbers one and two on the country's all-format and contemporary hit radio charts, respectively. In 2024, it was certified 3× Platinum by Music Canada.

In Australia, "Sk8er Boi" debuted at number three and held that position for two consecutive weeks, earning a Platinum certification from the Australian Recording Industry Association (ARIA). In New Zealand, the single debuted at number 46 and peaked at number two on December 8, 2002; it was certified 3× Platinum by Recorded Music NZ in 2025. "Sk8er Boi" also reached numbers three, seven, and eight on the singles charts in Ireland, Scotland, and the United Kingdom, respectively, receiving a 2× Platinum certification from the British Phonographic Industry (BPI) in 2024. Elsewhere, the song reached the top 10 in Croatia (number six), the Netherlands (number six), Austria (number seven), Flanders (number seven), Italy (number eight), Europe (number nine), and Romania (number nine).

== Music video ==
=== Background and synopsis ===
Lavigne performing on a car during an impromptu street concert in downtown Los Angeles in the "Sk8er Boi" music video.

The music video for "Sk8er Boi" was directed by Francis Lawrence and shot on July 27 and 28, 2002. On the first day of shooting, Lavigne filmed scenes inside an abandoned building that portrayed her band's setup location before a street performance. Her concert performance was shot at the intersection of 7th Street and South Spring Street in downtown Los Angeles on the second day. To gather extras for the crowd, skateboarding and BMX enthusiasts spray-painted the "Sk8er Boi" star logo to alert residents to the surprise performance, and the intersection was crowded with onlookers by the time filming started.

In the video, Lavigne wore a bejewelled wristband, baggy pants, Converse shoes, a green T-shirt with yellow lettering from Wilkesboro Elementary School in North Carolina, which she purchased at a New York City thrift shop, and a striped necktie from her father's closet. Rather than following the song's lyrics, the video centres on an impromptu concert held by Lavigne in a Los Angeles street intersection. It begins by showing several of her friends and band members promoting the concert in advance via graffiti, flyers, email, and posters. Lavigne and her band arrive at the location and begin performing on the roofs of their cars; a crowd quickly gathers. Toward the end of the song, police cars and a helicopter arrive to disperse the crowd, while Lavigne uses her guitar to break a car windshield. She then throws the guitar onto the road and looks up at the helicopter. Kerrang!'s Mike Rampton pointed out that the still of Lavigne looking up at the helicopter was used as the artwork on the single "Sk8er Boi".

=== Release and reception ===
On August 20, 2002, MTV aired a behind-the-scenes special on Making the Video. The video premiered two days later on MTV's teen-oriented countdown show Total Request Live, reaching number one on the program's chart within two days of its debut. On August 27, MTV gave the video and its making-of special a broader premiere across its main channels. Following the video's release, Wilkesboro Elementary School received numerous orders for the green-and-yellow T-shirt Lavigne wore, which had not been sold for four years. Elysa Gardner of USA Today wrote that Lavigne's persona in the song and video had more appeal for teen girls, and reassurance for their parents, than the shock tactics of Britney Spears, who emulated Madonna. The video was nominated for Best Pop Video at the 2003 MTV Video Music Awards. It was later voted one of the best music videos of the decade on Total Request Live, and BT Vision ranked it third on its list of the best music videos of the decade in the UK.

== Live performances and other uses ==
In a 2007 interview with Billboard, Lavigne said that "Sk8er Boi" remained one of her favourite songs to perform live and draw inspiration from for later material, stating, "Those songs come alive onstage, and I feel like that's the most me." On August 29, 2002, she performed abridged versions of "Complicated" and "Sk8er Boi" during the 2002 MTV Video Music Awards pre-show outside Radio City Music Hall. Lavigne performed the song on television and radio shows such as the Late Show with David Letterman, The Tonight Show with Jay Leno, and BBC Radio 1's Live Lounge. She opened the 2002 Billboard Music Awards with a medley of "Sk8er Boi" and "Complicated", and performed "Sk8er Boi" at the 45th Annual Grammy Awards. On February 20, 2003, she opened the 2003 Brit Awards with a performance of the track.

"Sk8er Boi" has been included on the setlists of all of Lavigne's headlining concert tours: Try to Shut Me Up Tour (2002–2003), Live by Surprise Tour (2004), Bonez Tour (2004–2005), The Best Damn Tour (2008), Black Star Tour (2011–2012), The Avril Lavigne Tour (2013–2014), Head Above Water Tour (2019), Love Sux Tour (2022–2023), and Greatest Hits Tour (2024–2025). In 2007, German Eurodance act Cascada covered "Sk8er Boi" for their second studio album, Perfect Day. Other artists who have covered the song include queer singer Weston Allen, Conan Gray, Machine Gun Kelly, Hueningkai of Tomorrow X Together, and Yoon of STAYC. American rapper Ashnikko reworked the song's lyrics into "L8r Boi" for her 2021 mixtape Demidevil. In 2023, Simple Plan covered "Sk8er Boi" at the When We Were Young festival, where Lavigne made a surprise appearance to perform it with them.

In late May 2003, it was reported that Paramount Pictures had optioned "Sk8er Boi" for a feature film adaptation to be written by David Zabel and produced by MTV Films and Alphaville. Plans for a film adaptation have not materialized; Lavigne last stated in 2021 that she intended to develop one for the song's 20th anniversary. She made a cameo appearance performing "Sk8er Boi" on the seventh season of the ABC sitcom Sabrina the Teenage Witch, though the performance was cut from the DVD release. The song was also featured in "The Promise", the second episode of the third season of Cold Case, and was sung by the character Josh Ray Person in the "Get Some" episode of the miniseries Generation Kill. "Sk8er Boi" has appeared in video games including Elite Beat Agents, Rock Revolution, SingStar Pop, and Just Dance 2024 Edition.

== Accolades ==
Following the song's release, the term skater boi entered the mainstream lexicon. Spin placed "Sk8er Boi" fifth on its list of the 21 best pop punk choruses of the 21st century. Billboard ranked the track at number three on its list of the best songs of 2002, and Cleveland.com placed it at number 25 among the 100 greatest pop punk songs. The song has also been featured on lists of Lavigne's best songs by the Recording Academy, American Songwriter (number one), The Tab (number three), AOL Radio (number four), and Digital Spy (number four). "Sk8er Boi" was nominated for Best Female Rock Vocal Performance at the 45th Annual Grammy Awards. At the 2003 MuchMusic Video Awards, it won two awards: Best International Video by a Canadian and People's Choice: Favourite Canadian Artist.

Awards and nominations for "Sk8er Boi" in 2003
Award	Category	Result	Ref.
45th Annual Grammy Awards	Best Female Rock Vocal Performance	Nominated	
MTV Video Music Awards	Best Pop Video	Nominated	
MuchMusic Video Awards	Best International Video by a Canadian	Won	
MuchMusic Video Awards	People's Choice: Favourite Canadian Artist	Won	
Nickelodeon Kids' Choice Awards	Favorite Song	Won	
Radio Disney Music Awards	Best Song to Air Guitar To	Won	
SOCAN Awards	Pop/Rock Music Award	Won	
Teen Choice Awards	Choice Music – Single	Won	

== Track listings ==
- US DVD single
1. "I'm with You"
2. "Sk8er Boi"
3. "Behind-the-Scenes Footage"
4. "Let Go TV Spots"
- Australian CD single
1. "Sk8er Boi" – 3:23
2. "Get over It" – 3:27
3. "Nobody's Fool" (live in Vancouver for Z95) – 3:58
- European standard CD single
1. "Sk8er Boi" – 3:23
2. "Get over It" – 3:27
- European enhanced CD single and UK CD single
1. "Sk8er Boi" – 3:23
2. "Get over It" – 3:27
3. "Nobody's Fool" (live in Vancouver for Z95) – 3:58
4. "Sk8er Boi" (video) – 3:38
- UK cassette single
1. "Sk8er Boi" – 3:23
2. "Get over It" – 3:27
3. "Nobody's Fool" (live in Vancouver for Z95) – 3:58

== Credits and personnel ==
Adapted from the CD single liner notes.

=== Locations ===
- Recorded at Decoy Studios in Valley Village, California
- Drums recorded at Real Music Studios in Los Angeles, California
- Mixed at South Beach Studios in Miami, Florida

=== Personnel ===
- Lead vocals – Avril Lavigne
- Songwriting – Avril Lavigne, Lauren Christy, Scott Spock, Graham Edwards
- Production, arrangement, recording, and additional vocals – The Matrix
- Drum recording – Mark Howard
- Mixing – Tom Lord-Alge
- Assistance – Femio Hernandez
- Guitar – Corky James
- Drums – Victor Indrizzo

== Charts ==
=== Weekly charts ===
Weekly chart performance for "Sk8er Boi"
Chart (2002–2003)	Peak position
Australia (ARIA)	3
Austria (Ö3 Austria Top 40)	7
Belgium (Ultratop 50 Flanders)	7
Belgium (Ultratop 50 Wallonia)	23
Canada (Nielsen SoundScan)	29
Canada Radio (Nielsen BDS)	2
Canada AC (Nielsen BDS)	28
Canada CHR/Top 40 (Nielsen BDS)	1
Croatia International Airplay (HRT)	6
Czech Republic (IFPI)	15
Denmark (Tracklisten)	11
Europe (European Hot 100 Singles)	9
France (SNEP)	28
Germany (GfK)	18
Greece (IFPI)	12
Ireland (IRMA)	3
Italy (FIMI)	8
Netherlands (Dutch Top 40)	6
Netherlands (Single Top 100)	11
New Zealand (Recorded Music NZ)	2
Norway (VG-lista)	14
Romania (Romanian Top 100)	9
Scottish Singles Sales (Official Charts)	7
Sweden (Sverigetopplistan)	12
Switzerland (Schweizer Hitparade)	17
UK Singles (Official Charts)	8
US Billboard Hot 100	10
US Adult Pop Airplay (Billboard)	23
US Pop Airplay (Billboard)	1

=== Year-end charts ===
2002 year-end chart performance for "Sk8er Boi"
Chart (2002)	Position
Australia (ARIA)	38
Canada (Nielsen SoundScan)	169
Canada Radio (Nielsen BDS)	54
Ireland (IRMA)	75
UK Singles (Official Charts)	165
US Billboard Hot 100	96
US Adult Top 40 (Billboard)	93
US Mainstream Top 40 (Billboard)	41

2003 year-end chart performance for "Sk8er Boi"
Chart (2003)	Position
Australia (ARIA)	86
Austria (Ö3 Austria Top 40)	52
Belgium (Ultratop 50 Flanders)	63
Belgium (Ultratop 50 Wallonia)	100
Ireland (IRMA)	56
Netherlands (Dutch Top 40)	55
Netherlands (Single Top 100)	79
Romania (Romanian Top 100)	54
Sweden (Sverigetopplistan)	82
UK Singles (Official Charts)	160
US Mainstream Top 40 (Billboard)	84

== Certifications ==
Certifications for "Sk8er Boi"
Region	Certification	Certified units/sales
Australia (ARIA)	Platinum	70,000^{^}
Brazil (Pro-Música Brasil)	Platinum	60,000^{*}
Canada (Music Canada)	3× Platinum	240,000^{‡}
Denmark (IFPI Danmark)	Gold	45,000^{‡}
Germany (BVMI)	Gold	250,000^{‡}
New Zealand (RMNZ)	3× Platinum	90,000^{‡}
United Kingdom (BPI)	2× Platinum	1,200,000^{‡}
United States (RIAA)	3× Platinum	3,000,000^{‡}
United States (RIAA) For video single, combined with "I'm with You"	Platinum	50,000^{^}
^{*} Sales figures based on certification alone.^{^} Shipments figures based on certification alone.^{‡} Sales+streaming figures based on certification alone.
