= Complicated (Avril Lavigne song) =

2002 single by Avril Lavigne

Single by Avril Lavigne

from the album Let Go
- B-side: "I Don't Give"; "Why"
- Released: March 11, 2002
- Studio: Decoy (Valley Village, Los Angeles)
- Genre: Pop rock
- Length: 4:05
- Label: Arista
- Songwriters: Avril Lavigne; Lauren Christy; Scott Spock; Graham Edwards
- Producer: The Matrix

Avril Lavigne singles chronology
"Complicated" (2002)	"Sk8er Boi" (2002)

Music video
- "Complicated" on YouTube

"Complicated" is the debut single by Canadian singer-songwriter Avril Lavigne from her debut album, Let Go (2002). It was released as her debut single on March 11, 2002, by Arista Records. Written by Lavigne and its producers the Matrix (Lauren Christy, Scott Spock, and Graham Edwards), the song is about being honest with oneself rather than "putting on a face".

"Complicated" received generally positive reviews from music critics, who praised the song as infectious pop rock. It peaked at number two on the Billboard Hot 100, ultimately selling 1.1 million copies in the US. The song also spent sixteen consecutive weeks at number one on the Billboard Adult Top 40 chart, breaking a record previously held by Natalie Imbruglia's "Torn". Internationally, the song topped the charts in Australia, Ireland, New Zealand, and Norway, with the song peaking in the top five in over twenty countries. It was nominated for two Grammy Awards: Song of the Year and Best Female Pop Vocal Performance.

== Background and release ==
After being signed to Arista Records, Lavigne moved to New York and began working on her debut album, Let Go, collaborating with a host of prime songwriters and producers. For a year, nothing was working for Lavigne and was on the verge of getting dropped off Arista. The management pitched her songs written by other songwriters, but she declined, insisting she wanted to write songs herself. Lavigne relocated to Los Angeles, where she collaborated with songwriter-producer Clif Magness, who gave her ample creative control in the writing process. Lavigne and Magness wrote "Losing Grip" and "Unwanted", songs that she deemed reflective of her vision for the entire album. However, Arista was not thrilled with the heavy-guitar laden songs that Lavigne was writing, prompting the label to look for other producers to match their demands.

Lavigne came to the attention of the three-piece production team the Matrix. Arista could not find the right direction for Lavigne, so the team's manager, Sandy Roberton, suggested that they work together. According to member Lauren Christy, they had been listening to Lavigne's early songs and felt they contained "a Faith Hill kind of vibe". As soon as they saw Lavigne coming into their studio, the Matrix felt that her musical direction was incongruous to her image and attitude. After talking to Lavigne for an hour, the singer said she wanted songs with punk rock inclinations. They told her to come back the following day, and in the afternoon during that day, they wrote a song that evolved into "Complicated" and another song called "Falling Down". According to Lauren Christy in a YouTube short, The Matrix presented basic chords for the song. Lavigne wanted the lyrics "complicated" and "frustrated," so The Matrix built a basic melody (likely with Lavigne's input, style, and approval). After constructing the melody, Lavigne and Christy wrote the bulk of the lyrics together under a tree. The composition process was recorded onto a RadioShack MC-60 microcassette. They played it to Lavigne, inspiring her musical path.

When Josh Sarubin, the A&R executive who signed Lavigne to the imprint, heard the song, he knew it was right for her. Lavigne presented the song to Reid, who agreed the musical direction Lavigne and the Matrix were taking, and set "Complicated" as the album's lead single.

== Composition ==
"Complicated" is a pop rock song about how people can feign or pretend in front of others. Lavigne said about the song: "People sometimes bother me how they're not real and how they're just, like, putting on a face and being two-faced". Lavigne stated that she experienced this with both boyfriends and female friends.

Sheet music for the song shows a moderate tempo of 80 beats per minute, in the key of F major.

== Critical reception ==
The song was met with generally positive reviews. In 2009, Rolling Stone readers voted "Complicated" as the eighth top single of the decade. "Complicated" also ranked at number 197 in Blender magazine's "The 500 Greatest Songs Since You Were Born". In an AOL Radio listener's poll, "Complicated" was voted Lavigne's sixth best song.

David Browne of Entertainment Weekly gave the song a B− and said "Avril Lavigne's not kidding about that title, she's the epitome of the blossoming anti-Britney movement". Christina Saraceno of AllMusic described "Complicated" as "a gem of a pop/rock tune with a killer chorus" and noted similarities between it and Pink's song "Don't Let Me Get Me". Saraceno highlighted the song as a "track pick" in a review of the album, Let Go.

On a more negative note, Sal Cinquemani of Slant magazine described 'Complicated' as "infectious" and "more poser than punk". In a review of Lavigne's second album, Under My Skin, David Browne of Entertainment Weekly noted that "'Complicated' felt like strung-together bits of Morissette songs".

Glenn Rowley of Grammy.com said the song's "runaway success also helped launch pop-punk's explosion into the mainstream, and the proliferation of artists and female-fronted bands that followed — from Paramore, Ashlee Simpson and Kelly Clarkson to Gen Z hitmakers like Olivia Rodrigo, Billie Eilish and Meet Me @ The Altar — are indebted to Lavigne's trailblazing success with the song".

== Commercial performance ==
"Complicated" peaked at number two on the US Billboard Hot 100 and stayed for 31 weeks on the chart. It was Lavigne's longest charting song on the chart. "Complicated" peaked at number one on the US Billboard Adult Top 40 Airplay and Mainstream Top 40 Airplay charts, number 13 on the US Adult Contemporary chart, and number 30 on the US Rhythmic chart. The single was certified 3× platinum in the United States with 3 million copies sold, making it the best selling debut single by a female Canadian singer. Billboard ranked it at number 83 of the 'Top 100 Singles of the Decade'.

In the United Kingdom, "Complicated" peaked at number three on the UK Singles Chart and was certified 3× platinum with more than 1,800,000 copies sold and streamed. In Canada, the single peaked at number 21 on the Canadian Singles Chart and was the fourth-most-played song on Canadian radio in 2002, as well as the most-played song of the year by a native artist. In New Zealand, the single peaked at number one for 9 consecutive weeks on the RIANZ Singles Chart and was certified platinum with 10,000 copies sold. "Complicated" also peaked and debuted at number one in Australia, Ireland, and Norway; number two in Austria, Denmark, Europe, Hungary, Netherlands, Scotland, Sweden, and Switzerland; and number three in Belgium, Germany, and Poland. It was certified 2× platinum in Australia with 140,000 copies sold, and gold in Denmark with 45,000 copies sold. "Complicated" was certified gold in Austria, Belgium, Italy, Japan, Sweden and Switzerland, and platinum in Brazil and Norway.

== Music video ==
Lavigne in the video – wearing tie, Chuck Taylor All-Stars and skater clothes. According to Butch Walker, the outfit originates from an alternate cover for his album Left of Self-Centred.

The video, directed by the Malloys, starts with Lavigne asking her bandmates if they want to "crash" the mall. They respond with enthusiasm and skateboard there. The video features Lavigne and the band harassing shoppers and employees, generally causing havoc around the mall; for example, Lavigne watches her bandmates try on humorous clothing, shown as Lavigne sings the line "You come over unannounced, dressed up like you're something else".

This is intercut with footage of Lavigne performing the song at a skatepark while playing the guitar, with her band performing with her. People can be seen skateboarding around Lavigne as she and her band perform the song. As the line "You fall and you crawl..." is sung, a skateboarder can be seen falling over.

The video for "Complicated" was shot March 4–5, 2002 at Westfield Eagle Rock Plaza, Los Angeles, as well as a local skatepark. During the shooting, the mall remained open. The music video was released in April 2002.

As of January 2026, the video has over 843 million views on YouTube.

The music video was ranked at number 41 on Billboard's 100 Greatest Music Videos of the 21st Century.

== Accolades ==
Lavigne received the 2002 MTV Video Music Award: Best New Artist in a Video ("Complicated"). "Complicated" won in the Single of the Year category at the 2003 Juno Awards. In the United States, the song was nominated for two 2003 Grammy Awards: Best Female Pop Vocal Performance and Song of the Year; it lost both awards to Norah Jones's "Don't Know Why". It was nominated for the 2003 MTV Video Music Brazil for best international video. In April 2020, Billboard ranked the track at number two on their list of "The 50 Greatest Minivan Rock Songs".

Key
†	Indicates non-competitive categories

Accolades for "Complicated"
Award/Publisher	Year	Category	Result	Ref.
ASCAP Pop Music Awards	2003	Most Performed Song †	Won	
ASCAP Pop Music Awards	2004	Most Performed Song †	Won	
Billboard Music Awards	2002	Top 40 Track of the Year	Nominated	
BMI Pop Music Awards	2003	Award-Winning Song †	Won	
BMI Pop Music Awards	2004	Award-Winning Song †	Won	
Canadian Radio Music Awards	2003	Best New "Mainstream AC / Hot AC"	Won	
Canadian Radio Music Awards	2003	Best New CHR Solo	Won	
Channel V Thailand Music Video Awards	2003	Popular International Music Video By A New Artist	Won	
Grammy Award	2003	Song of the Year	Nominated	
Grammy Award	2003	Best Female Pop Vocal Performance	Nominated	
Ivor Novello Awards	2003	International Hit of the Year	Won	
Juno Award	2003	Single of the Year	Won	
MTV Video Music Awards	2002	Best New Artist in a Video	Won	
MTV Video Music Awards Japan	2003	Video of the Year	Nominated	
MTV Video Music Awards Japan	2003	Best Female Video	Nominated	
MTV Video Music Awards Japan	2003	Best New Artist in a Video	Won	
MTV Video Music Brazil	2003	Best International Video	Nominated	
Radio Disney Music Awards	2002	Best Song	Won	
Radio Disney Music Awards	2002	Best Homework Song	Won	
Radio Music Awards	2003	Song of the Year/Modern Adult Contemporary Radio	Won	
Rolling Stone	2009	Readers' Top Singles of the Decade	8th place	
SOCAN Awards	2003	International Achievement †	Won	
SOCAN Awards	2003	Pop/Rock Music Award †	Won	
TMF Awards (Belgium)	2002	Best Clip: International	Won	
VH1 Big Awards	2002	Can't Get You Out of My Head	Nominated	

== Track listings and formats ==
- US CD single and 7-inch vinyl
1. "Complicated" (Tom Lord-Alge mix) – 4:05
2. "Complicated" (the Matrix mix) – 4:02
- European CD single
1. "Complicated" (Tom Lord-Alge mix) – 4:05
2. "I Don't Give" – 3:39
- Italian and Japanese CD single
1. "Complicated" (The Matrix mix) – 4:03
2. "I Don't Give" – 3:39
- UK cassette and European maxi-single 1
1. "Complicated" (Tom Lord-Alge mix) – 4:05
2. "I Don't Give" – 3:39
3. "Why" – 3:59
4. "Complicated" (video)
- Australian maxi-single and European maxi-single 2
1. "Complicated" (The Matrix mix) – 4:03
2. "I Don't Give" – 3:39
3. "Why" – 3:59
4. "Complicated" (video)

== Credits and personnel ==
Credits and personnel are adapted from the "Complicated" CD single liner notes.

- Avril Lavigne – writer, lead vocals
- The Matrix – writer, producer, arrangement, recording, background vocals
- Tom Lord-Alge – mixing at South Beach Studios (Miami)
- Corky James – guitar
- Victor Indrizzo – drums

== Charts ==
=== Weekly charts ===
2002 weekly chart performance for "Complicated"
Chart (2002)	Peak position
Australia (ARIA)	1
Austria (Ö3 Austria Top 40)	2
Belgium (Ultratop 50 Flanders)	3
Belgium (Ultratop 50 Wallonia)	5
Canada (Nielsen SoundScan)	21
Canada Radio (Nielsen BDS)	1
Canada AC (Nielsen BDS)	5
Canada CHR/Top 40 (Nielsen BDS)	1
Chile (Notimex)	5
Colombia (Notimex)	1
Croatia International Airplay (HRT)	4
Czech Republic (IFPI)	4
Denmark (Tracklisten)	2
Europe (European Hot 100 Singles)	2
Finland (Suomen virallinen lista)	17
France (SNEP)	21
Germany (GfK)	3
Greece (IFPI)	15
Hungary (Rádiós Top 40)	18
Hungary (Single Top 40)	20
Ireland (IRMA)	1
Italy (FIMI)	2
Mexico (Monitor Latino)	3
Netherlands (Dutch Top 40)	2
Netherlands (Single Top 100)	4
New Zealand (Recorded Music NZ)	1
Norway (VG-lista)	1
Peru (Notimex)	3
Poland (Polish Airplay Charts)	3
Romania (Romanian Top 100)	8
Scottish Singles Sales (Official Charts)	2
Spain (Promusicae)	7
Sweden (Sverigetopplistan)	2
Switzerland (Schweizer Hitparade)	2
UK Singles (Official Charts)	3
US Billboard Hot 100	2
US Adult Contemporary (Billboard)	13
US Adult Pop Airplay (Billboard)	1
US Pop Airplay (Billboard)	1
US Rhythmic Airplay (Billboard)	30

2022 weekly chart performance for "Complicated"
Chart (2022)	Peak position
Japan Hot Overseas (Billboard Japan)	7

=== Year-end charts ===
2002 year-end chart performance for "Complicated"
Chart (2002)	Position
Australia (ARIA)	9
Austria (Ö3 Austria Top 40)	3
Belgium (Ultratop 50 Flanders)	18
Belgium (Ultratop 50 Wallonia)	28
Brazil (Crowley)	10
Canada (Nielsen SoundScan)	151
Canada Radio (Nielsen BDS)	4
Europe (European Hot 100)	9
Germany (Media Control)	21
Ireland (IRMA)	23
Italy (FIMI)	4
Netherlands (Dutch Top 40)	5
Netherlands (Single Top 100)	30
New Zealand (RIANZ)	1
Sweden (Hitlistan)	17
Switzerland (Schweizer Hitparade)	9
UK Singles (OCC)	36
UK Airplay (Music Week)	18
US Billboard Hot 100	11
US Adult Top 40 (Billboard)	5
US Mainstream Top 40 (Billboard)	2
US Top 40 Tracks (Billboard)	2
US CHR/Pop (Radio & Records)	3
US Hot AC (Radio & Records)	5

2003 year-end chart performance for "Complicated"
Chart (2003)	Position
Brazil (Crowley)	95
US Adult Contemporary (Billboard)	45
US Adult Top 40 (Billboard)	34

=== Decade-end charts ===
Decade-end chart performance for "Complicated"
Chart (2000–2009)	Position
Australia (ARIA)	92
US Billboard Hot 100	83
US Pop Songs (Billboard)	23

== Certifications ==
Certifications and sales for "Complicated"
Region	Certification	Certified units/sales
Australia (ARIA)	2× Platinum	140,000^{^}
Austria (IFPI Austria)	Gold	15,000^{*}
Belgium (BRMA)	Gold	25,000^{*}
Brazil (Pro-Música Brasil)	Platinum	60,000^{*}
Canada (Music Canada)	4× Platinum	320,000^{‡}
Denmark (IFPI Danmark)	Platinum	90,000^{‡}
Germany (BVMI)	Platinum	600,000^{‡}
Italy (FIMI)	Platinum	100,000^{‡}
Japan (RIAJ) Full-length ringtone	Gold	100,000^{*}
New Zealand (RMNZ)	4× Platinum	120,000^{‡}
Norway (IFPI Norway)	Platinum	10,000^{*}
Portugal (AFP)	Gold	20,000^{‡}
Spain (Promusicae)	Platinum	60,000^{‡}
Sweden (GLF)	Gold	15,000^{^}
Switzerland (IFPI Switzerland)	Gold	20,000^{^}
United Kingdom (BPI)	3× Platinum	1,800,000^{‡}
United States (RIAA)	4× Platinum	4,000,000^{‡}
^{*} Sales figures based on certification alone.^{^} Shipments figures based on certification alone.^{‡} Sales+streaming figures based on certification alone.

== Release history ==
Release dates and formats for "Complicated"
Region	Date	Format(s)	Label	Ref.
United States	March 11, 2002	Adult contemporary radio; hot adult contemporary radio	Arista	
United States	May 7, 2002	Contemporary hit radio	Arista	
Japan	July 10, 2002	CD	Arista	
Australia	July 15, 2002	CD	Arista	
New Zealand	August 5, 2002	CD	Arista	
Germany	August 26, 2002	CD	Arista	
United Kingdom	September 23, 2002	Cassette; CD	Arista	
Australia	February 17, 2003	CD	Arista	

== Cover versions ==
Olivia O'Brien released a cover of "Complicated" in 2015. She performed the song during the Olivia O'Brien Show tour in 2021. In 2023, it was certified silver by the British Phonographic Industry (BPI).

"Weird Al" Yankovic parodied the song as "A Complicated Song" on his 2003 album Poodle Hat.

In the anime Scott Pilgrim Takes Off, the episode 2 Scott 2 Pilgrim features Kieran Culkin (who voiced Wallace Wells) randomly and abruptly covering the song to a news reporter. Vulture called the moment "a perfect Canadian '00s pop-rock reference."
