= Corky James =

American guitarist and bassist

- Born: February 10, 1954 (age 72); Washington, D.C., United States
- Genres: Rock, acoustic, alternative rock, pop
- Occupations: Musician, producer
- Instruments: Guitar, bass
- Years active: 1989–present
- Label: Various
- Website: corkyjames.net

Corky James (born February 10, 1954) is a Los Angeles–based session guitarist and bassist who has appeared on a considerable number of music albums and motion picture soundtracks. His genres encompass rock, pop, country, singer-songwriter, and film scores, and James operates an active recording studio in Los Angeles.

Working with artists such as Avril Lavigne, Jordin Sparks, Demi Lovato, and Paul Stanley, he has played on hit singles that have reached No. 1 worldwide including "Sk8er Boi" and "I'm with You". He has also played on hit singles that reached the Billboard Hot 100 Airplay charts including: "Why Can't I?", "(There's Gotta Be) More To Life", and "No Air",

== Early life ==
James was born in Washington, D.C., on February 10, 1954, and grew up in nearby Arlington, Virginia, and went by his birth name, "Jimmy McCorkle", until 1972. The third of four children, both his parents exposed him and his siblings to music at a young age; his mother played both piano and organ, while his father sang and called square dances. According to James, he first developed an interest in guitar after seeing Elvis Presley on television at around the age of five. As early as elementary school he played guitar in bands that performed at school dances, private parties, or variety shows. He later left college, where he was earning a degree in business administration, to become a full-time musician.

== Music career ==
=== Early years ===
James initially got his start by playing with a number of cover bands in the Washington, D.C., and Baltimore areas. After a time he moved to Los Angeles, California, where he began attending the Dick Grove School of Music and began teaching private guitar lessons. He began networking with a number of musicians, songwriters, and producers in the California music industry, and picked up several high-profile touring jobs. James also worked with a number of local original bands, before becoming primarily a studio musician, also at times contributing writing and production.

=== As session musician ===
He operates a private studio, "The Wire," where he does much of his session work and collaborates with other artists. After becoming active as a session musician in the late 1980s, his discography credits include many contemporary recording artists such as: Avril Lavigne, Liz Phair, Stacie Orrico, Kelly Clarkson, Jordin Sparks, Ashley Parker Angel, Cock Robin (band), Hilary Duff, Bo Bice, Kevin Gilbert, LeAnn Rimes, Paul Stanley, Alex Band, Lili Haydn, Meat Loaf; and music producers Kenny "Babyface" Edmonds, The Matrix, Desmond Child and The Underdogs.

He has played on hit singles that have reached No. 1 worldwide including: "Sk8er Boi", "I'm with You" as well as the Grammy Awards nominated song "Complicated". He also played on hit singles that reached the Billboard Hot 100 Airplay charts including: "Why Can't I?", "(There's Gotta Be) More To Life", and "No Air", as well as playing guitar & bass on the American Idol Season 4: The Showstoppers CD.

=== Film soundtracks ===
Corky James performed on the soundtrack for the movie Bobby, a Golden Globe Award-nominated historical drama film written & directed by Emilio Estevez and contributed several music cues for the documentary movie More than a Game. Among the many other soundtracks he's contributed to are the On the Line soundtrack (2001), More than a Game soundtrack (2009), and the X-Men: First Class soundtrack (2011).

=== Accolades ===
He has been awarded over six RIAA gold and platinum CD plaques representing over 10 million certified sales.

== Discography ==
=== Production credits ===
Incomplete list of production credits for Corky James
Year	Album	Artist(s)	Album charts		Certifications, role
Year	Album	Artist(s)	BB 200	UK albums	Certifications, role
1989	First Love / Last Rites	Cock Robin	—	—	Guitar
2001	On the Line soundtrack	Various	35	—	Guitar (Electric), Main Personnel, Vocals
2002	Twisted Angel	LeAnn Rimes	12	14	Bass, guitar
2002	Let Go	Avril Lavigne	2	1	Guitar
2005	American Idol Season 4: The Showstoppers	Various	—	—	Gold album; guitar & bass
2006	Bobby soundtrack	Mark Isham	—	—	
2007	Jordin Sparks	Jordin Sparks	10	17	US Platinum; guitar (acoustic/electric)
2009	More than a Game soundtrack	Various	—	—	Musical cues
2011	X-Men: First Class soundtrack	Henry Jackman	—	—	Guitar
2011	Hold On 'til the Night	Greyson Chance	29	—	Guitar
2011	Ghost on the Canvas	Glen Campbell	24	27	Guitar (acoustic)
2011	American Idol 10th Anniversary – The Hits	Various	136	—	Guitar
2013	Demi	Demi Lovato	3	10	2× Platinum; banjo, guitar
"—" denotes a recording that did not chart or was not released in that territory.
