= Try to Shut Me Up Tour =

2002–2003 concert tour by Avril Lavigne

- World tour by Avril Lavigne
- Promotional poster for the tour
- Location: Asia; Europe; North America; Oceania
- Associated album: Let Go
- Start date: December 5, 2002
- End date: June 4, 2003
- Legs: 5
- No. of shows: 70

Avril Lavigne concert chronology
- Try to Shut Me Up Tour (2002–2003); Live by Surprise Tour (2004)

The Try to Shut Me Up Tour was the debut concert tour by Canadian recording artist Avril Lavigne. Beginning in December 2002, the tour supported the singer's debut studio album, Let Go (2002). The trek played 70 dates in North America, Asia, Europe and Australia. The concert was chronicled on the video set My World. Filmed at the HSBC Arena in Buffalo, New York, the DVD features the full-length concert, music videos, a behind the scenes featurette and a live CD.

== Opening acts ==
- Our Lady Peace (Europe)
- Gob (April 9–11, 16–19, 27–28, May 13, and June 2–3)
- Swollen Members (April 9–11)
- Simple Plan (April 16–19, 30)

== Tour dates ==
List of 2002 concerts
Date	City	Country	Venue
December 5, 2002 (Note: The December 5, 2002, concert in Buffalo was part of "Kiss 98.5 Kissmas Bash.)	Buffalo	United States	HSBC Arena
December 6, 2002 (Note: The December 6, 2002, concert in Arlington was part of "106.1 KISS-FM KISSMAS Jingle Ball".)	Arlington	United States	Music Mill Amphitheater
December 7, 2002	Baltimore	United States	Bohager's Nightclub
December 12, 2002 (Note: The December 12, 15, and 19, 2002 concerts were part of the "Jingle Ball")	New York City	United States	Madison Square Garden
December 14, 2002	Atlanta	United States	The Tabernacle
December 15, 2002	Miami	United States	American Airlines Arena
December 17, 2002 (Note: The December 17, 2002 concert in Denver was part of "95.7 Kissmas Ball")	Denver	United States	Pepsi Center
December 19, 2002	Anaheim	United States	Arrowhead Pond of Anaheim
December 20, 2002	Modesto	United States	State Theatre
December 21, 2002 (Note: The December 21, 2002, concert was part of "Kiss 106.1 Jingle Bell Bash")	Tacoma	United States	Tacoma Dome

List of 2003 concerts
Date	City	Country	Venue
January 6, 2003	Hartford	United States	Connecticut Expo Center
January 12, 2003 (Note: The January 12, 2003, in Washington was part of "Hot 99.5 Mess Fest".)	Washington, D.C.	United States	Nation
January 14, 2003	Columbus	United States	Veterans Memorial Auditorium
January 15, 2003	Kansas City	United States	Memorial Hall
January 23, 2003	Singapore		Suntec Singapore Theatre
January 27, 2003	Seoul	South Korea	Millennium Hall
March 3, 2003 (Note: The March 3, 2003 concert in Copenhagen was originally scheduled at K.B. Hallen.)	Copenhagen	Denmark	Vega
March 4, 2003	Oslo	Norway	Rockefeller Music Hall
March 6, 2003	Stockholm	Sweden	Annexet
March 8, 2003	Brussels	Belgium	Ancienne Belgique
March 9, 2003	Berlin	Germany	Columbiahalle
March 10, 2003	Cologne	Germany	Palladium
March 12, 2003	Munich	Germany	Kulturhalle Zenith
March 13, 2003	Milan	Italy	Discoteca Alcatraz
March 14, 2003	Zürich	Switzerland	Volkshaus
March 16, 2003	Hamburg	Germany	CCH Saal 3
March 17, 2003	Amsterdam	Netherlands	Heineken Music Hall
March 18, 2003	Paris	France	Zénith de Paris
March 20, 2003	Birmingham	England	Carling Academy
March 21, 2003	Manchester	England	Carling Apollo
March 22, 2003	Glasgow	Scotland	Barrowland Ballroom
March 24, 2003 (Note: The March 24, 2003 concert in Dublin was originally scheduled at Olympia Theatre.)	Dublin	Ireland	Point Theatre
March 25, 2003	London	England	O_{2} Brixton Academy
March 26, 2003	London	England	O_{2} Brixton Academy
March 27, 2003	London	England	O_{2} Brixton Academy
April 9, 2003	Toronto	Canada	Air Canada Centre
April 10, 2003	Ottawa	Canada	Corel Centre
April 11, 2003	Montreal	Canada	Bell Centre
April 13, 2003	London	Canada	John Labatt Centre
April 15, 2003	Cleveland	United States	CSU Convocation Center
April 16, 2003	Pittsburgh	United States	Petersen Events Center
April 17, 2003	Indianapolis	United States	Conseco Fieldhouse
April 19, 2003	Chicago	United States	UIC Pavilion
April 20, 2003	Saint Paul	United States	Xcel Energy Center
April 21, 2003	Winnipeg	Canada	Winnipeg Arena
April 23, 2003	Calgary	Canada	Pengrowth Saddledome
April 24, 2003	Edmonton	Canada	Skyreach Centre
April 26, 2003	Vancouver	Canada	Rogers Arena
April 27, 2003	Portland	United States	Memorial Coliseum
April 28, 2003	Tacoma	United States	Tacoma Dome
April 30, 2003	San Jose	United States	HP Pavilion
May 1, 2003	Long Beach	United States	Long Beach Arena
May 2, 2003	Phoenix	United States	Arizona Veterans Memorial Coliseum
May 4, 2003	Dallas	United States	Fair Park Coliseum
May 5, 2003	San Antonio	United States	Freeman Coliseum
May 6, 2003	Houston	United States	Reliant Arena
May 8, 2003	Duluth	United States	Gwinnett Civic Center Arena
May 9, 2003	St. Louis	United States	Savvis Center
May 10, 2003	Auburn Hills	United States	The Palace of Auburn Hills
May 12, 2003	Fairfax	United States	Patriot Center
May 13, 2003	Uniondale	United States	Nassau Coliseum
May 15, 2003	Lowell	United States	Tsongas Arena
May 16, 2003	Lowell	United States	Tsongas Arena
May 17, 2003	Philadelphia	United States	First Union Spectrum
May 18, 2003	Buffalo	United States	HSBC Arena
May 27, 2003	Osaka	Japan	Zepp Osaka
May 29, 2003	Tokyo	Japan	Nippon Budokan
June 1, 2003	Melbourne	Australia	Rod Laver Arena
June 2, 2003	Sydney	Australia	Sydney Entertainment Centre
June 3, 2003	Sydney	Australia	Sydney Entertainment Centre
June 4, 2003	Brisbane	Australia	Brisbane Entertainment Centre

== Box office score data ==
Venue	City	Tickets sold / available	Gross revenue
Connecticut Expo Center	Hartford	6,058 / 6,058 (100%)	$78,523
John Labatt Centre	London	9,157 / 9,157 (100%)	$221,673
CSU Convocation Center	Cleveland	9,954 / 9,954 (100%)	$241,545
Conseco Fieldhouse	Indianapolis	9,193 / 12,852 (71%)	$255,942
UIC Pavilion	Chicago	8,853 / 8,853 (100%)	$249,090
Winnipeg Arena	Winnipeg	11,511 / 11,511 (100%)	$272,141
Pengrowth Saddledome	Calgary	13,723 / 13,723 (100%)	$324,665
Skyreach Centre	Edmonton	13,471 / 13,471 (100%)	$319,270
Rogers Arena	Vancouver	14,872 / 14,872 (100%)	$347,267
Tacoma Dome	Tacoma	15,295 / 15,295 (100%)	$305,025
HP Pavilion	San Jose	13,380 / 13,380 (100%)	$399,205
Long Beach Arena	Long Beach	12,713 / 12,713 (100%)	$412,818
Gwinnett Civic Center Arena	Duluth	10,306 / 10,306 (100%)	$294,580
Savvis Center	St. Louis	13,192 / 14,761 (89%)	$352,443
The Palace of Auburn Hills	Auburn Hills	15,781 / 15,781 (100%)	$419,290
Nassau Coliseum	Uniondale	14,327 / 14,327 (100%)	$388,298
Tsongas Arena	Lowell	15,024 / 15,024 (100%)	$507,944
First Union Spectrum	Philadelphia	13,657 / 13,657 (100%)	$382,219
HSBC Arena	Buffalo	11,000 / 11,000 (100%)	$234,810
Rose Garden	Portland	20,500 / 20,500 (100%)	Unknown
