= Losing Grip =

2003 single by Avril Lavigne

Single by Avril Lavigne

from the album Let Go
- Released: March 24, 2003
- Studio: Blue Iron Gate (Santa Monica, California); Signet Sound Delux (Hollywood, California)
- Genre: Grunge; nu metal; pop
- Length: 3:53
- Label: Arista
- Songwriters: Avril Lavigne; Clif Magness
- Producer: Clif Magness

Avril Lavigne singles chronology
"I'm with You" (2002)	"Losing Grip" (2003)	"Mobile" (2003)

Music video
- "Losing Grip" on YouTube

"Losing Grip" is a song by Canadian singer-songwriter Avril Lavigne, released as the fourth single and the first track from her debut album, Let Go, in March 2003. The song was written by Lavigne and Clif Magness, and produced by Magness. The song, which is lyrically about Lavigne "losing grip" with her boyfriend as they are just not meant to be, is much heavier with nu metal oriented sounds than most of the songs on Let Go that had a more poppy feel. She performed "Losing Grip" at the Juno Awards of 2003. The song's video single was certified gold by the Recording Industry Association of America (RIAA) on September 22, 2003. It was nominated for the Grammy Award for Best Female Rock Vocal Performance, losing out to Pink's "Trouble".

== Background ==
Arista Records intended for "Anything but Ordinary" to serve as the fourth single from Let Go, although Lavigne successfully pressed the label to release "Losing Grip" instead.

== Music video ==
The music video was directed by Liz Friedlander and was filmed on February 25 and 26, 2003, at the Angel Orensanz Foundation in New York City. It shows scenes of Lavigne and her band performing in front of a large crowd. There are also shots of her moshing and surfing through the crowd while pushing, punching and shoving people from time to time. The "crowd surfing" routine was practiced by other people on the audience during the shoot before Lavigne was allowed to do so.

== Reception ==
Chicago Tribune described the song as a grunge song. Pitchfork described the song as a nu metal-pop song. Christina Saraceno of AllMusic noted that "Losing Grip" allowed Lavigne to "show off" her vocal ability during the song's "explosive rock chorus". Sal Cinquemani of Slant magazine also praised Lavigne's vocals and compared them to Canadian singer-songwriter Alanis Morissette.

=== Awards and nominations ===
"Losing Grip" was nominated for the Grammy Award for Best Female Rock Vocal Performance, but lost to "Trouble" by Pink.

Awards and nominations for "Losing Grip"
Award/Publisher	Year	Category	Result	Ref.
Canadian Radio Music Awards	2003	Best New Rock/Alternative Solo	Won	
Grammy Awards	2004	Best Female Rock Vocal Performance	Nominated	

== Track listings ==
- UK & Ireland CD, Single, Promo
1. "Losing Grip" (album version) – 3:53
- Uk CD Single
1. "Losing Grip" (album version) – 3:53
2. "Losing Grip" (live) – 4:56
- Australian CD
1. "Losing Grip" (album version) – 3:53
2. "I'm with You" (live) – 3:57
3. "Unwanted" (live) – 4:01
4. "Losing Grip" (video)
- European CD
1. "Losing Grip" (album version) – 3:53
2. "Losing Grip" (live) – 4:56
3. "Naked" (live) – 4:24
4. "Losing Grip" (video)
- UK Cassette
1. "Losing Grip" (album version) – 3:53
2. "Losing Grip" (live) – 4:56
3. "Naked" (live) – 4:24
4. "Losing Grip" (album version) – 3:53
5. "Losing Grip" (live) – 4:56
6. "Naked" (live) – 4:24

== Charts ==
=== Weekly charts ===
Weekly chart performance for "Losing Grip"
Chart (2003)	Peak position
Australia (ARIA)	20
Austria (Ö3 Austria Top 40)	40
Belgium (Ultratop 50 Flanders)	48
Belgium (Ultratip Bubbling Under Wallonia)	4
Canada CHR (Nielsen BDS)	8
Canada Rock (Nielsen BDS)	39
Europe (Eurochart Hot 100)	46
Germany (GfK)	43
Ireland (IRMA)	18
Netherlands (Dutch Top 40)	8
Netherlands (Single Top 100)	38
Scottish Singles Sales (Official Charts)	22
Switzerland (Schweizer Hitparade)	49
UK Singles (Official Charts)	22
US Billboard Hot 100	64
US Adult Pop Airplay (Billboard)	33
US Pop Airplay (Billboard)	17

=== Year-end charts ===
Year-end chart performance for "Losing Grip"
Chart (2003)	Position
US Mainstream Top 40 (Billboard)	99

== Certifications ==
Cetifications and sales for "Losing Grip"
Region	Certification	Certified units/sales
United States (RIAA) Video single	Gold	50,000^{^}
^{^} Shipments figures based on certification alone.

== Release history ==
Release dates and formats for "Losing Grip"
Region	Date	Format(s)	Label	Ref.
United States	March 24, 2003	Contemporary hit radio	Arista	
Australia	May 5, 2003	CD	Arista	
Denmark	June 30, 2003	CD	Arista	
Germany	June 30, 2003	CD	Arista	
United Kingdom	July 7, 2003	Cassette; CD	Arista	
