= Scott Spock =

American songwriter, record producer, and composer

David Scott Alspach, known professionally as Scott Spock, is an American songwriter, record producer and composer. He is known for being a member of the pop writing and production team The Matrix, who have written and produced many hit singles that have reached #1 worldwide. Alspach is best known for his songs with Avril Lavigne, Korn, Hilary Duff, Shakira, Jason Mraz, David Bowie, Britney Spears, Christina Aguilera, Liz Phair, Busted and Rihanna.

== Life ==
At Southern Illinois University, Spock was awarded Bachelor of Science in Math Studies / Statistics in 1988 and a Bachelor of Music in Music / Jazz Performance in 1989. He is married as of 2024.

== Selected discography ==
Songs where Spock is credited separately by name for songwriting

Artist	Song(s)	Notes
Avril Lavigne	"Complicated", "I'm With You", "Sk8er Boi"	"Complicated" nominated for Song of the Year at 45th Annual Grammy Awards "I'm With You" nominated for Song of the Year at 46th Annual Grammy Awards
