= I'm a Mess (Avril Lavigne and Yungblud song) =

2022 single by Avril Lavigne featuring Yungblud

Single by Avril Lavigne and Yungblud

from the album Love Sux (Deluxe edition)
- B-side: "Bois Lie"; "Love It When You Hate Me"; "Bite Me"; "Mercury in Retrograde"; "Pity Party"
- Released: November 3, 2022
- Genre: Pop-punk; alternative rock; emo
- Length: 3:07
- Label: DTA; Elektra
- Songwriters: Avril Lavigne; Dominic Harrison; John Feldmann; Travis Barker
- Producers: John Feldmann; Travis Barker

Avril Lavigne singles chronology
"Love It When You Hate Me" (2022)	"I'm a Mess" (2022)	"Fake as Hell" (2023)

Yungblud singles chronology
"Tissues" (2022)	"I'm a Mess" (2022)	"Lowlife" (2023)

Music video
- "I'm a Mess" on YouTube

"I'm a Mess" is a song by Canadian singer Avril Lavigne and English singer Yungblud, released on November 3, 2022. The song appears on the deluxe edition of Lavigne's seventh studio album Love Sux and as an official track in her Greatest Hits compilation.

== Background ==
The release of "I'm a Mess" was announced on October 24, 2022, in a livestream featuring Yungblud cutting Lavigne's hair with a snippet of the song playing.

== Composition ==
"I'm a Mess" is "a slow-burning guitar ballad" which "begins with Lavigne singing about an absent loved one", and "drums kick in later ahead of Yungblud's verse, which hears the Doncaster artist say his life "hasn't been the same since that night". In the chorus, the duo each long for a reunion".

== Critical reception ==
"I'm a Mess" was received positively upon release; with Jack Rogers of Rock Sound describing the song as "really lovely", and an "open, existential and sentimental love song all about feeling lost and alone but knowing that there is someone else at there who can bring it back to the centre", further remarking that "the duo bounce off and complement each other beautifully, making it a track that will stick with you long after it has faded away." Writing for Kerrang!, Emily Carter referred to the song as "a sweet, sentimental ballad".

Consequence named "I'm a Mess" as Song of the Week, with Paolo Ragusa praising both Lavigne's and Yungblud's vocals and their "authentic performances and heartfelt honesty"; further remarking "if 'I'm a Mess' is any indication, Lavigne's next album cycle might double down on this kind of sincerity, and she sounds radiant and truly inspired. And with a pop rock hook that belongs among the best of Lavigne's choruses, 'I'm a Mess' is a memorable step forward for both [Yungblud] and Avril Lavigne."

== Commercial performance ==
In the United States, "I'm a Mess" had commercial success on airplay where it reached at number 12 on the US Adult Top 40 chart. It debuted at number 33 on the US Billboard Hot Rock & Alternative Songs chart. The song reached at number 24 on the US Pop Airplay chart and it spent fourteen weeks on the chart.

== Music video ==
The music video for "I'm a Mess" was released the same day as the single, and features Lavigne "getting reflective in the sunshine while [Yungblud] wanders around a gloomy London, before they meet up at the end for a performance of the song."

== Live performances ==
"I'm a Mess" was performed live on June 21, 2024, during Avril Lavigne's concert at the Pinkpop Festival as part of her Greatest Hits Tour, with the song being a surprise track featuring Yungblud.

== Track listing and formats ==
Digital download

1. "I'm a Mess" – 3:07

Streaming

1. "I'm a Mess" – 3:07
2. "Bois Lie" (Avril Lavigne featuring Machine Gun Kelly) – 2:43
3. "Love It When You Hate Me" (Avril Lavigne featuring Blackbear) – 2:25
4. "Bite Me" (Avril Lavigne) – 2:39

Digital download and streaming (Japanese extended play)

1. "I'm a Mess" – 3:07
2. "Mercury in Retrograde" (Avril Lavigne) – 2:09
3. "Pity Party" (Avril Lavigne) – 1:54

== Charts ==
=== Weekly charts ===
Weekly chart performance for "I'm a Mess"
Chart (2022–23)	Peak position
Australia Digital Tracks (ARIA)	25
Belgium (Ultratop 50 Flanders)	44
Canada Digital Songs (Billboard)	34
Canada CHR/Top 40 (Billboard)	45
Canada Hot AC (Billboard)	27
Czech Republic Airplay (ČNS IFPI)	38
Japan Hot Overseas (Billboard)	12
New Zealand Hot Singles (RMNZ)	39
UK Singles Downloads (Official Charts)	25
UK Singles Sales (OCC)	28
US Adult Contemporary (Billboard)	22
US Adult Pop Airplay (Billboard)	12
US Hot Rock & Alternative Songs (Billboard)	28
US Pop Airplay (Billboard)	24

=== Year-end charts ===
Year-end chart performance for "I'm a Mess"
Chart (2023)	Position
US Adult Top 40 (Billboard)	43

== Release history ==
"I'm a Mess" release history
Region	Date	Format(s)	Label(s)	Ref.
Various	November 3, 2022	Digital download; streaming	DTA; Elektra	
Italy	November 11, 2022	Radio airplay	Warner	
United States	November 14, 2022	Adult contemporary radio; hot adult contemporary radio; modern adult contemporary radio	Elektra; 300 Elektra	
United States	November 15, 2022	Contemporary hit radio	Elektra; 300 Elektra	
