= Love Sux Tour =

2022–2024 concert tour by Avril Lavigne

- Tour by Avril Lavigne
- Promotional poster for tour (2022)
- Location: Asia; Europe; North America; South America
- Associated album: Love Sux
- Start date: 30 April 2022
- End date: 10 May 2023
- No. of shows: 48
- Supporting acts: All Time Low; Alther; The Beaches; Day Limns; Girlfriends; Grandson; Mod Sun; Phem; Simple Plan
- Website: avrillavigne.com

Avril Lavigne concert chronology
- Head Above Water Tour (2019); Love Sux Tour (2022–2023); Greatest Hits Tour (2024–2025)

The Love Sux Tour (originally titled Tour 2022 and the Bite Me Tour) was the seventh concert tour by Canadian recording artist, Avril Lavigne, launched in support of her seventh studio album Love Sux (2022). It commenced on April 30, 2022, in Orillia, Canada, and concluded on May, 10 2023, in London, England. The tour included appearances at festivals across Canada, Europe and North America.

== Background ==
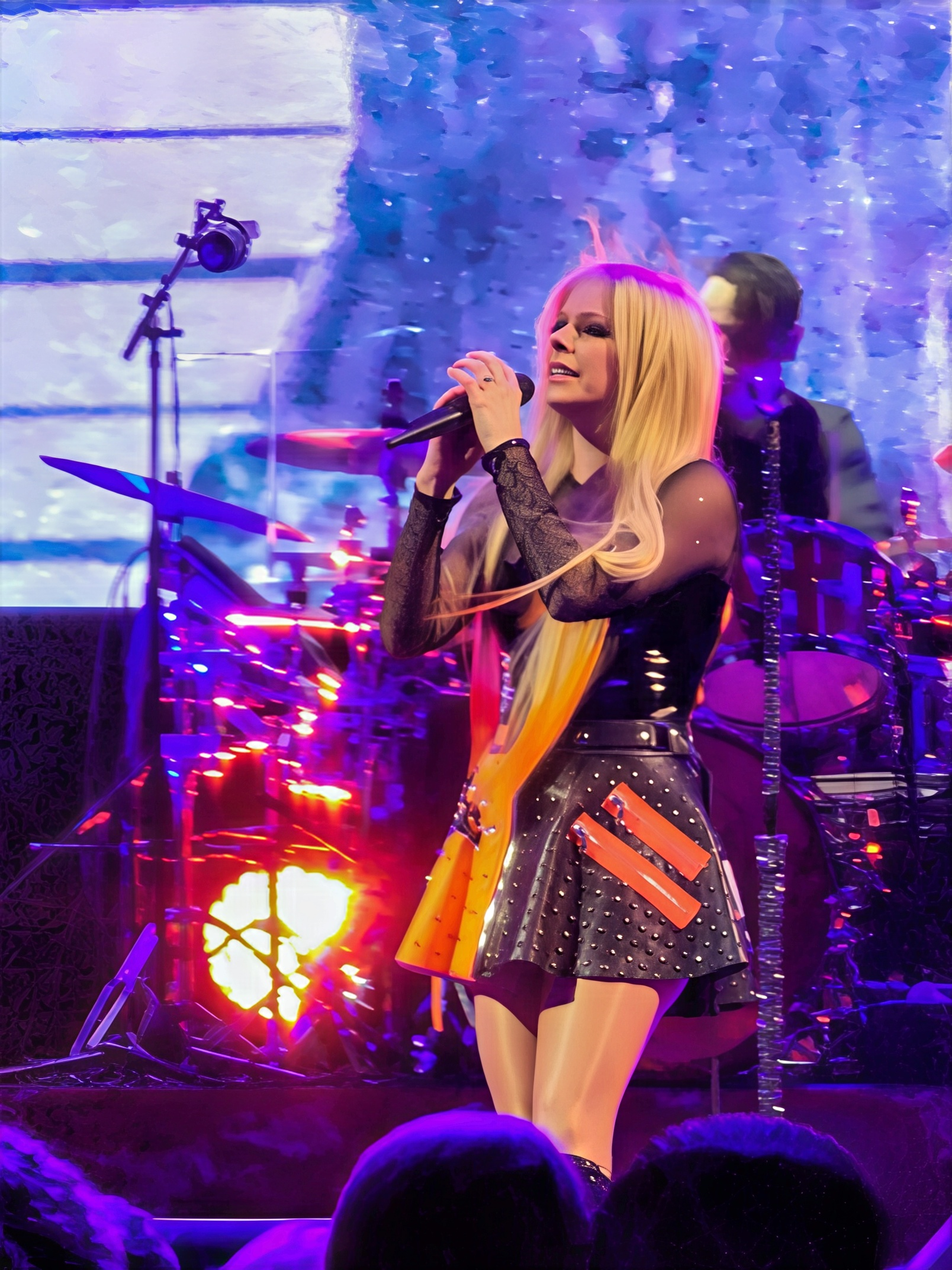
Lavigne performing at Caesars Windsor in Windsor, Ontario.

Following her Head Above Water Tour in 2019, Lavigne announced shows in Europe, in October 2021. The dates were composed of canceled shows from 2020 and 2021, due to the pandemic. It was also reported shows in southeast Asia for May 2022, but those shows were cancelled. Following the release of the album's lead single, the singer revealed concerts in Canada, her first in a decade.

Alternative rap artists Mod Sun and Grandson served as the opening acts.

One dollar from each concert ticket purchased was donated to the Avril Lavigne Foundation.

The tour was originally slated to start February 2022, but were rescheduled to the spring. European dates were postponed to 2023, citing venue and travel restrictions, related to the ongoing pandemic. During the tour, Lavigne also performed at various music festivals including: Boston Calling, When We Were Young, Rock in Rio, the Firefly Music Festival, and the iHeartRadio Music Festival.

== Set list ==
The set list is from the May 10, 2022, concert in London, Ontario. It may not represent all concerts for the tour.

1. "Cannonball"
2. "Bite Me"
3. "What the Hell"
4. "Here's to Never Growing Up"
5. "Complicated"
6. "My Happy Ending"
7. "Smile"
8. "Losing Grip"
9. "Flames" (performed with Mod Sun)
10. "Love It When You Hate Me"
11. "Love Sux"
12. "Girlfriend"
13. "Bois Lie"
14. "Sk8er Boi"

Encore

15. "Head Above Water"
16. "I'm with You"

== Tour dates ==
List of 2022 concerts
Date	City	Country	Venue	Opening acts
April 30	Orillia	Canada	Casino Rama Entertainment Centre	The Beaches
May 6	Quebec City	Canada	Videotron Centre	All Time Low; Mod Sun
May 7 (Note: Concert was originally scheduled for May 1, 2022.)	Laval	Canada	Place Bell	All Time Low; Grandson; Mod Sun
May 9	Ottawa	Canada	TD Place Arena	All Time Low; Mod Sun
May 10	London	Canada	Start.ca Performance Stage	Grandson; Mod Sun
May 12	Windsor	Canada	The Colosseum at Caesars Windsor	Grandson; Mod Sun
May 13	Toronto	Canada	Coca-Cola Coliseum	Grandson; Mod Sun
May 17	Winnipeg	Canada	Canada Life Centre	Grandson; Mod Sun
May 18	Saskatoon	Canada	SaskTel Centre	Grandson; Mod Sun
May 19	Edmonton	Canada	Rogers Place	Grandson; Mod Sun
May 21	Calgary	Canada	Southern Alberta Jubilee Auditorium	Grandson; Mod Sun
May 22	Calgary	Canada	Southern Alberta Jubilee Auditorium	Grandson; Mod Sun
May 24	Vancouver	Canada	Thunderbird Sports Centre	Grandson; Mod Sun
May 25	Victoria	Canada	Save-On-Foods Memorial Centre	Grandson; Mod Sun
May 27 (Note: The May 27, 2022, concert was part of Boston Calling Music Festival.)	Boston	United States	Harvard Athletic Complex	—N/a
June 1 (Note: Concert was originally scheduled for May 3, 2022.)	Moncton	Canada	Avenir Centre	The Beaches
June 2 (Note: Concert was originally scheduled for May 4, 2022.)	Halifax	Canada	Scotiabank Centre	The Beaches
September 5	Lima	Peru	Arena Perú	Alther
September 7	São Paulo	Brazil	Espaço Unimed	Day Limns
September 9 (Note: The September 9, 2022, concert was part of Rock in Rio.)	Rio de Janeiro	Brazil	Parque dos Atletas	—N/a
September 22 (Note: The September 22, 2022, concert was part of Firefly Music Festival.)	Dover	United States	Dover Motor Speedway	—N/a
September 24 (Note: The September 24, 2022, concert was part of iHeartRadio Music Festival.)	Las Vegas	United States	Area15	—N/a
October 22 (Note: The October 22, 23 and 29, 2022, concerts were part of When We Were Young.)	Winchester	United States	Las Vegas Festival Grounds	—N/a
October 23	Winchester	United States	Las Vegas Festival Grounds	—N/a
October 29	Winchester	United States	Las Vegas Festival Grounds	—N/a
November 7	Yokohama	Japan	National Convention Hall	—N/a
November 9	Tokyo	Japan	Tokyo Garden Theatre	—N/a
November 10	Tokyo	Japan	Tokyo Garden Theatre	—N/a
November 11	Nagoya	Japan	Aichi Sky Expo Hall A	—N/a
November 14	Osaka	Japan	Intex Osaka	—N/a

List of 2023 concerts
Date	City	Country	Venue	Opening acts
April 12	Paris	France	Zénith Paris	Girlfriends; Phem
April 14	Amsterdam	Netherlands	AFAS Live	Girlfriends; Phem
April 15	Berlin	Germany	Verti Music Hall	Girlfriends; Phem
April 17	Hamburg	Germany	Alsterdorfer Sporthalle	Girlfriends; Phem
April 18	Offenbach	Germany	Stadthalle Offenbach	Girlfriends; Phem
April 20	Munich	Germany	Kulturhalle Zenith	Girlfriends; Phem
April 21	Zürich	Switzerland	The Hall	Girlfriends; Phem
April 23	Padua	Italy	Kioene Arena	Girlfriends; Phem
April 24	Milan	Italy	Mediolanum Forum	Girlfriends; Phem
April 26	Prague	Czech Republic	Tipsport Arena	Girlfriends; Phem
April 27	Vienna	Austria	Wiener Stadthalle	Girlfriends; Phem
April 28	Stuttgart	Germany	Porsche-Arena	Girlfriends; Phem
April 30	Łódź	Poland	Atlas Arena	Girlfriends; Phem
May 3	Cologne	Germany	Palladium	Girlfriends; Phem
May 4	Brussels	Belgium	Forest National	Girlfriends; Phem
May 6	Manchester	England	O_{2} Apollo	Girlfriends; Phem
May 9	London	England	Alexandra Palace	Girlfriends; Phem
May 10	London	England	Alexandra Palace	Girlfriends; Phem

== Cancelled shows ==
List of cancelled concerts
Date	City	Country	Venue	Reason
November 1, 2022	Hong Kong		AsiaWorld–Arena	COVID-19 pandemic in Asia
November 3, 2022	Quezon City	Philippines	Araneta Coliseum	COVID-19 pandemic in Asia
