= Greatest Hits Tour (Avril Lavigne) =

2024–2025 concert tour by Avril Lavigne

- Tour by Avril Lavigne
- Promotional poster for the tour
- Location: Europe; North America
- Associated album: Greatest Hits
- Start date: May 22, 2024
- End date: June 29, 2025
- No. of shows: 69
- Supporting acts: All Time Low; Girlfriends; Royal & the Serpent; Simple Plan; Fefe Dobson; We The Kings
- Website: avrillavigne.com

Avril Lavigne concert chronology
- Love Sux Tour (2022–2023); Greatest Hits Tour (2024–2025)

The Greatest Hits Tour was the eighth concert tour by Canadian recording artist Avril Lavigne. It began on May 22, 2024, in Vancouver, Canada, and concluded on June 29, 2025, in Oro-Medonte, Canada, consisting of 69 shows.

Designed to promote Lavigne's discography, the majority of concerts on the Greatest Hits Tour took place in North America, while her European dates primarily consisted of festival appearances.

== Background ==
During 2022 and 2023, Lavigne embarked on her Love Sux Tour, promoting her seventh studio album Love Sux (2022). This tour spanned across Asia, Europe, North America and South America. At the end of 2023, Lavigne revealed a series of European festival dates, accompanied by select stand-alone concerts including performances in Pula, Croatia and Cardiff, Wales. In January 2024, she announced a lineup of tour dates across the United States and Canada, officially naming the tour the Greatest Hits Tour.

On December 2, 2024, it was announced that the tour would be extended with an additional leg, featuring concerts across the United States and Canada through May and June 2025. Lavigne is set to perform a mix of arena and stadium concerts, with one festival appearance scheduled for June 29 at the All My Friends Fest.

== Critical reception ==
=== North America ===
For the opening show of the Greatest Hits tour, the Vancouver Sun's Stuart Derdeyn praised the performance for delivering a high-energy, nostalgia-filled experience that delighted longtime fans. He noted that Lavigne "really did deliver all hits and no filler", and described the show as "the kind of legacy act showcase that will paste smiles on the faces of her now 40-something fans". Reviewing the same opening night in Vancouver, Alyson Eng of BroadwayWorld commended Lavigne's vocal performance and nostalgic appeal, though she mentioned some technical issues with the sound. Eng observed that despite these problems, the concert was "a powerful testament to Lavigne's enduring connection with her fans". The first concert also received praise from Caroline Charruyer of Canadian Beats, noted that the "setlist was well-curated," with songs that "showcased her vocal prowess and emotional depth." Charruyer described the event as a celebration not only of the artist's greatest hits but also of "the remarkable journey of an artist who has remained true to herself." Each song was met with "enthusiastic cheers and fervent sing-alongs," and the crowd "erupted in thunderous ovation." She characterized the concert as "a triumphant celebration of her career, filled with nostalgia, emotion, and pure rock energy," making it "a night to remember for all in attendance."

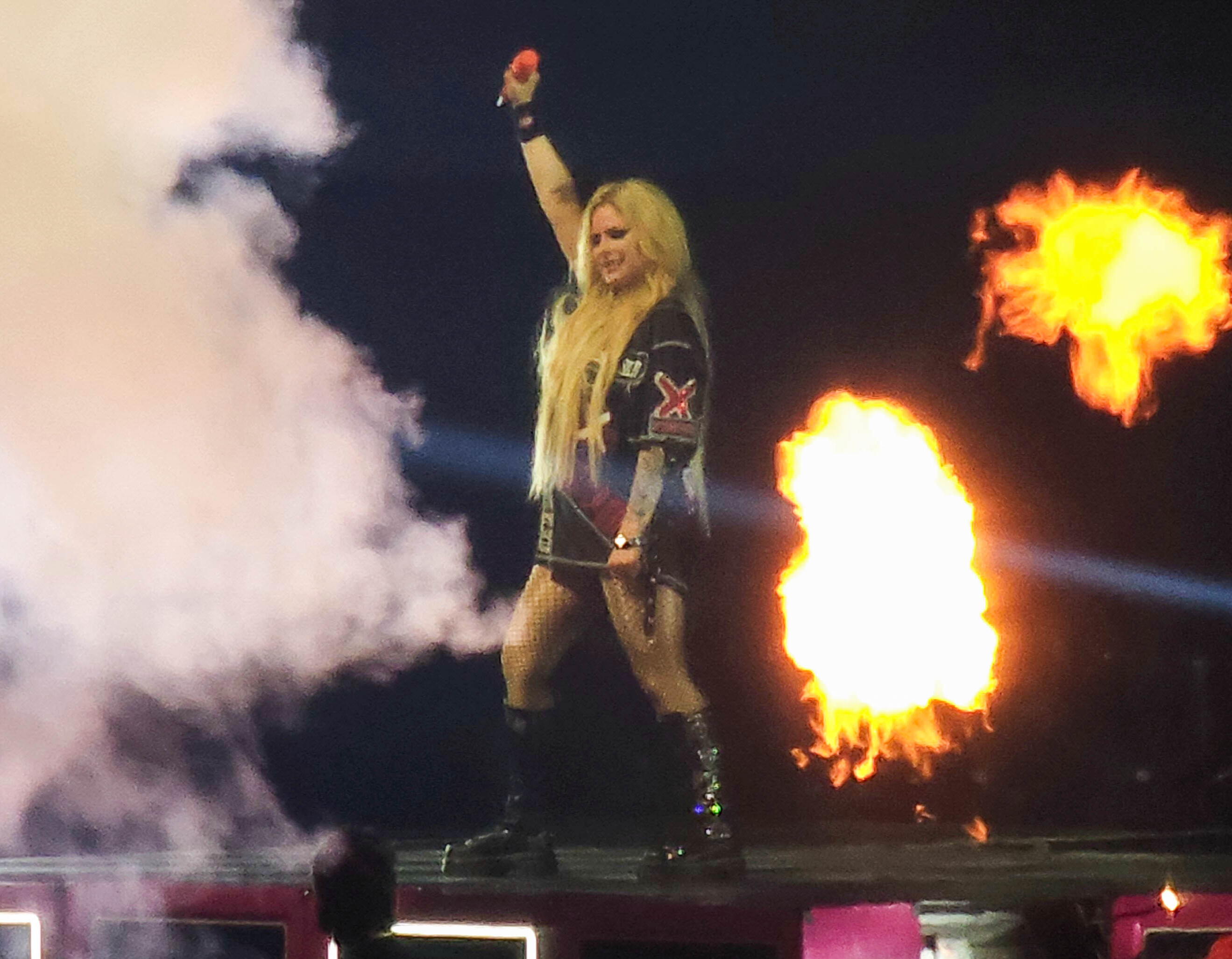
Lavigne concluding her show at Budweiser Stage, Toronto

Reviewing the Mountain View concert, Jim Harrington of The Mercury News highlighted Lavigne's strong vocals and engaging stage presence, noting that the show featured "unfussy pop-punk pretty much from start to finish" and was well received by the crowd of longtime fans. Santiago Hernandez of Out Magazine also praised Lavigne for her high-energy performance and nostalgic appeal, noting that "there's something magical about an entire stadium screaming a 22-year-old song". Kat Sophia of Santa Barbara Independent also praised Lavigne's energy and nostalgic performance, noting that "highlights like "My Happy Ending", "I'm With You" and "Sk8er Boi" lit up the energy in the venue in a palpable manner". Conversely, Gabe Lehman of SFGate observed that while the audience was enthusiastic and fully committed to the pop-punk vibe, Lavigne's energy did not match that of her fans, making parts of the performance feel like "Avril Lavigne karaoke". Mike DeWald of Riff Magazine, also praised Avril Lavigne's Mountain View Shoreline show, stating that she "is in the midst of a renaissance" and her Greatest Hits tour is "a smashing success". He lauded the production, noting that "it felt like a spectacle," and highlighted her interaction with the crowd. DeWald emphasized that her "biggest strengths are the songs and her voice." He also mentioned how Lavigne "thanked fans for their support over the years and reflected on her humble beginnings" multiple times during the concert. Additionally, he observed that Lavigne now appears more comfortable on stage than in her previous concerts: "Lavigne looked more at ease interacting with the crowd; before, she was more awkward."

For her Canadian shows, Billboard stated that her concert in Toronto was acclaimed as a celebration of "her impressive career", as someone who "made her mark in the 2000s as a young singer making space for herself in a male-dominated pop-rock field". Her "outdoor performance at Budweiser Stage should be a little less cramped, but no less fun", and the tour "has been hitting all the right notes for fans". They concluded that Lavigne is one of Canada's biggest pop stars and was recently named to the Order of Canada in June 2024, following recognition from Hollywood's Walk of Fame in 2022 and Canada's Walk of Fame in 2023.

Annie Jonas, writing for Boston.com, reviewed Avril Lavigne's performance at Boston Calling 2025, describing her show as "highly anticipated" following her "standout appearance in 2022". Jonas noted that "her energy was contagious", with fans "singing, head-banging, and dancing" throughout the set. The review highlighted that Lavigne's "performance showcased not just her enduring charisma but also her ability to connect across generations". Boston.com, in another article, also named her show one of the festival's highlights and a must-see: "the pop-punk sensation delivered an electrifying performance on Day 2 of Boston Calling 2025, headlining the penultimate set of the night on the Green Stage". Victoria Wasylak of the Boston Globe described Boston Calling 2025 as "a millennial rock marathon", highlighting Avril Lavigne as one of three millennial rock icons alongside Fall Out Boy and Cage the Elephant. Lavigne delivered her signature scowling pop-rock and bratty bubblegum energy, with her set described as "a standout moment of nostalgia and raw attitude".

Geoff Herbert from Syracuse.com reviewed Avril Lavigne's 2025 concert in Syracuse, reporting that "Avril Lavigne and more than 10,000 fans proved it on a rainy Wednesday night" that "pop-punk is not dead". The review highlights that "she swayed breezily on stage, even during faster songs, and told stories about starting her career". According to the outlet, she "didn't look or sound much different from the pop-punk princess who inspired millions of teens to wear striped ties with tank tops".

Deborah Cruz for Yahoo! and Parade wrote that, during her May 30, 2025, concert at Madison Square Garden, Avril Lavigne surprised fans by bringing her mother on stage, sharing a heartfelt story from her childhood. She recalled, "When I was 2 years old, I came home from church singing 'Jesus Loves Me'", and her mother responded, "I said you’re going to be a singer!" Lavigne reflected, "I don't know how she knew it", highlighting the early start of her music career. The moment occurred during Lavigne's Greatest Hits tour stop in New York, celebrating over two decades of her songs. On Instagram, she shared: "Both my mom and dad saw something in me and encouraged me to practice very hard and pursue my dream". Cruz added that "for millennials who grew up with Lavigne's anthems, watching her honor her mother on one of the world's most famous stages feels like witnessing the full-circle moment we didn't know we needed".

=== Europe ===
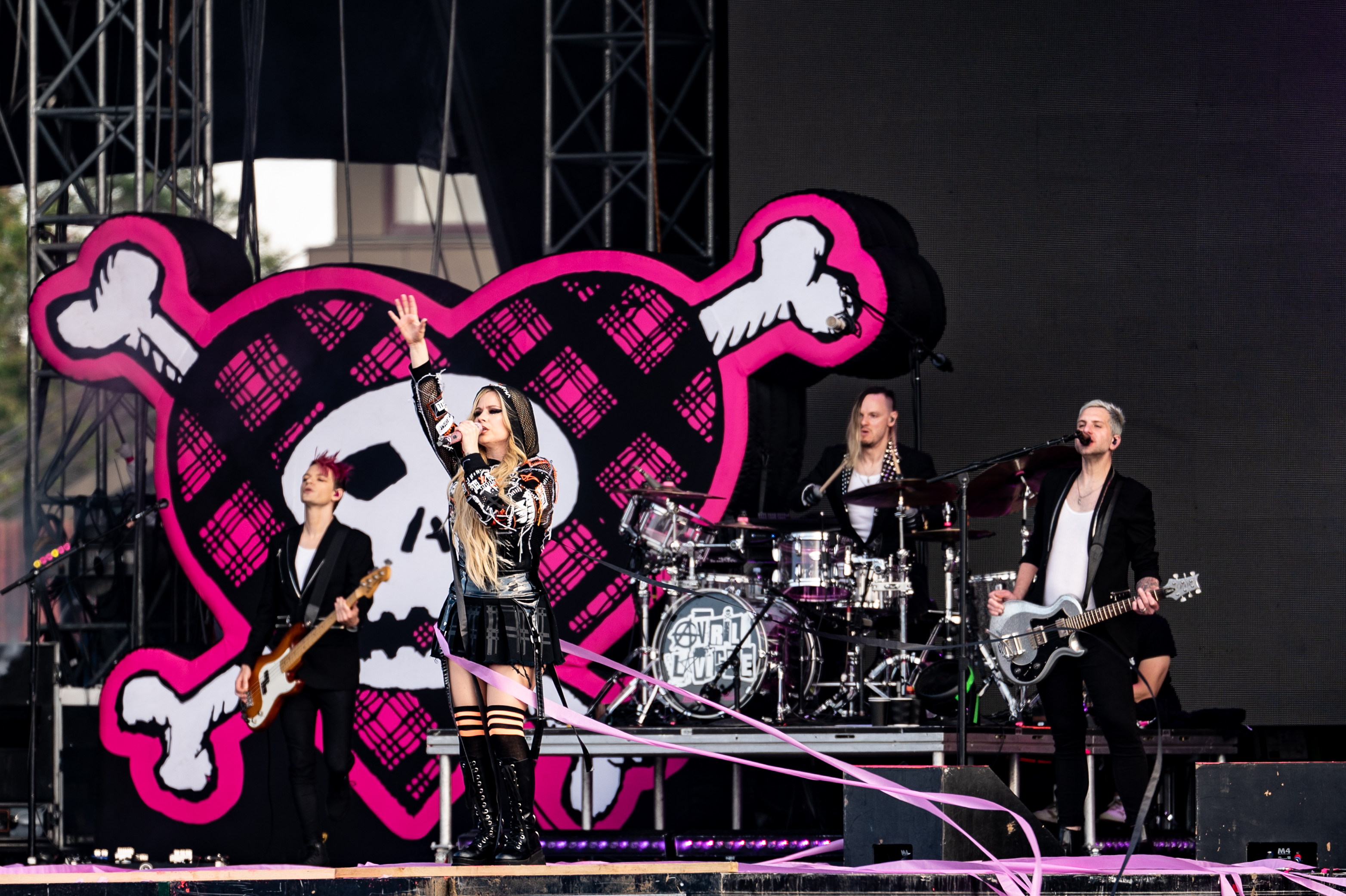
Lavigne performing at Southside Festival on June 23, 2024.

Commenting on her first concert of the European leg of the tour at the Rock for People festival in Hradec Králové, Ondřej Hricko from Music Server praised Lavigne's vocal performance, noting that she "handled the concert vocally excellently" and lauded how she established a welcomed female counterpart amidst the predominantly male headliners. He further explains how she maintained a strong connection with the audience and showcased her charisma. Šárka Hellerová from Headliner praised Lavigne for delivering what fans expected. She further explains how Lavigne's second encore created an emotional moment, saying, "I watched some fans singing with all their hearts". However, others remarked on her getting out of breath easily and leaving the stage for an extended break.

Reviewing Lavigne's debut concert in Croatia, critics highlighted the memorable and nostalgic experience delivered by singer. Marko Bratoš of Glazba.hr praised the performance, emphasizing the powerful connection between Lavigne and her fans. Bratoš noted, "Nostalgia has rarely managed to disrupt reason and bring a huge silly smile to one's face as it did last night at the Arena". He also mentioned that the show was filled with energy and excitement, with Lavigne's strong vocal performance and infectious enthusiasm impressing the audience. Barbara Ban of Jutarnji list further lauded Lavigne's concert, noting that "the performance in Pula was a significant event for Croatian fans". Juraj Dukić Hrvoić of Sound Guardian echoed these sentiments, highlighting the impressive setlist and visual presentation. Dukić Hrvoić commented, "The concert was an unforgettable blend of nostalgia and high energy", with Lavigne captivating the audience both visually and vocally. Emanuela Plišić of Music Box further confirmed these sentiments, praising Lavigne for her ability to engage and energize the audience.

Lavigne's Greatest Hits Tour in the Netherlands received praise from the Dutch press. Roel Peijs of OOR observed that "a mature artist was on the stage", with a legacy that "fits into the pop ranks alongside Robbie Williams and P!nk". Her vocals were notably spotlighted. The publication also mentioned that "her place in this year's lineup was more than justified". Fans were able to "reminisce about their festival wild days with a touch of nostalgia" in a show that offered "a blend of comfort and adventure". Lavigne's show at the Hurricane Festival in Germany was considered by Julia Langmaack, of Stagr, as "a triumphant return". The reviewer said the singer "has lost none of her energy and stage presence". Her performance was marked by "vocals, charisma, and emotional connection". Markus Brandstetter, by Musikexpress ranked Avril Lavigne's performance at the Southside Festival in Germany as well, as one of the best of the festival. Journalists from Schwäbische Zeitung who were present as the Southside Festival wrote that, "for many people, the highlight of the night was likely Avril Lavigne", where fans "floated in nostalgia once more and enjoyed her upbeat songs".

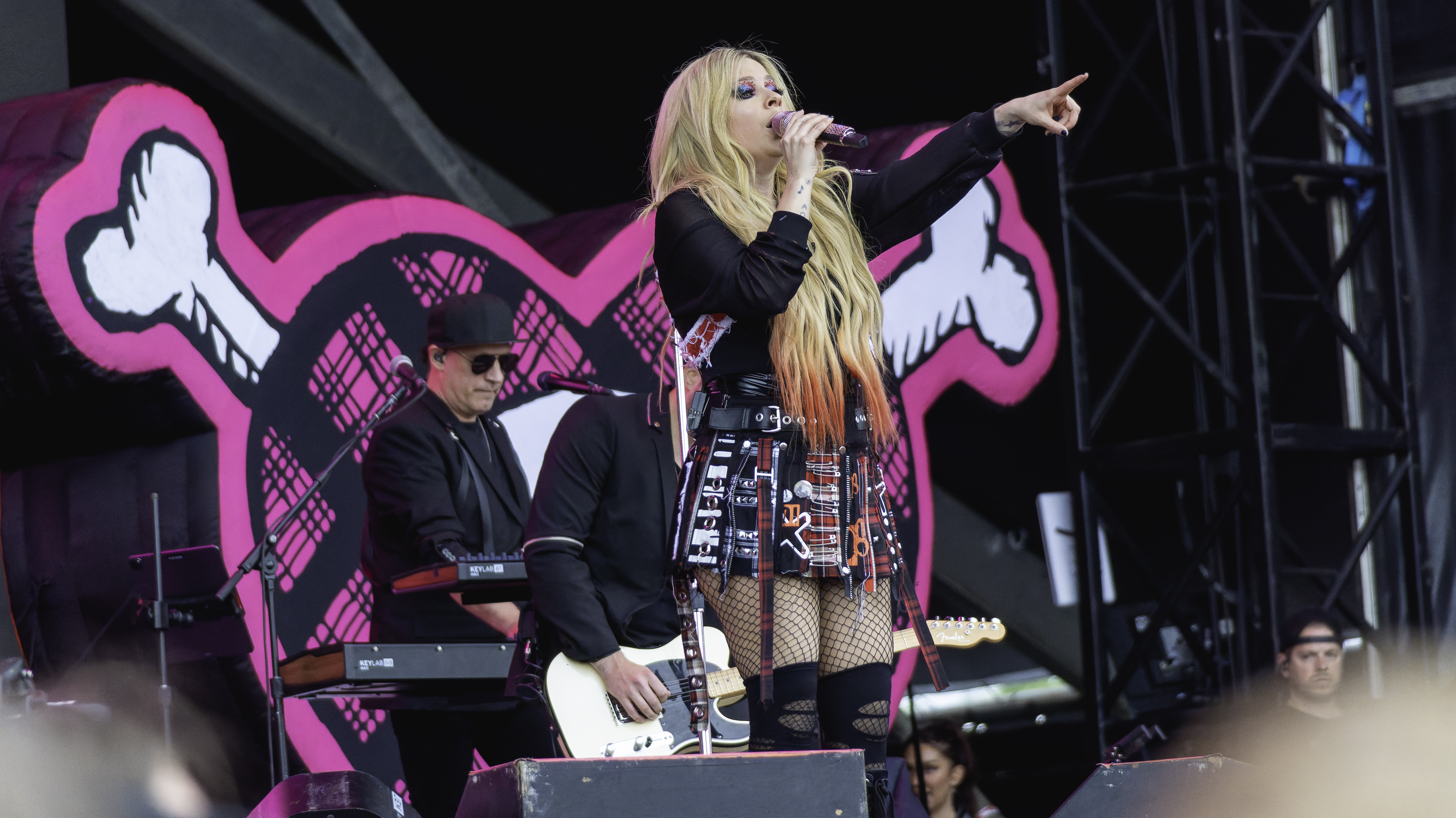
Lavigne performing at Glastonbury on June 30, 2024.

For the United Kingdom concerts, Avril Lavigne attracted a massive audience for her Glastonbury performance. Journalists from The Guardian, covering the event, reported there was a "vast crowd are hollering it back to her. It’s so big that they’re not letting anyone else into the field from our backstage zone, a real crowd-control rarity." Many news outlets highlighted how Avril Lavigne's concert at the Glastonbury festival had main stage energy and audience size. Adam White, for The Independent, praised her show, stating she was "another artist plonked on far too small a stage." The publication rated her performance 5 out of 5 stars: "This is a brilliant show, but Glastonbury must learn lessons from a year that has vastly underestimated the appeal of pop nostalgia". Rosie Long Decter from Billboard, also stated that "Avril Lavigne played one of the most popular sets at Glastonbury" as her "performance overshadowed the main stage." The article noted that Lavigne's concert caused the main stage performer to "perform to a smaller crowd." The article concluded that "Glastonbury might have underestimated the star's contemporary appeal by booking her on a side stage, but the turnout made it clear Lavigne isn't losing her grip anytime soon." Rachel Roberts, of Kerrang!, reported that the area Avril was playing was "unbearably jam packed". The author also described how "it seems Glastonbury underestimated just how many want to see her perform" as "thousands of voices singing back to her prove just how much she has been missed". For Clash, Robin Murray, discussed how "Avril Lavigne has drawn a colossal crowd to Glastonbury’s other stage". Alexis Petridis, for The Guardian, also reviewed Lavigne's concert at a British festival, noting that the audience was not just singing, but "cathartically emoting like mad" while perched on "people’s shoulders". Petridis mentioned that Lavigne organizing a crowd singalong seemed somewhat unnecessary, given that everyone in the field was already belting out every word of her songs. Her set list received praise as well, with the publication remarking that "anyone who wasn't under her spell in the early '00s might be startled at how robust her songs sound 20 years on". They described her songs as "exceptionally well written", emphasizing that there was no drop in musical quality over the years. Throughout the concert, "certainly, there was no drop off in the audience’s enthusiasm". Overall, The Guardian gave her concert a rating of 4 out of 5 stars.

Wales Online reviewed Avril Lavigne's concert in Cardiff, noting that the singer "delivered one banger after another". They praised her interaction with the crowd and mentioned that when she picked up the guitar, she reminded fans she's more than just an impressive vocalist. Adam Maidment of Yahoo UK reviewed Avril Lavigne's 'Greatest Hits' concert in Manchester. Maidment noted that the setlist provoked "euphoric sing-alongs from the sold-out crowd". He also mentioned that the singer "pretty much commanded the stage from the get-go and had the crowd in the palm of her hand", with the audience "jumping, cheering, and singing out every verse at the top of their lungs". The concert structure was also praised, highlighting that "the show featured everything from confetti cannons and pyrotechnics, alongside a few inflatable balls thrown around the crowd for good measure too". The reviewer concluded that her show "is a testament that we don't necessarily have to be serious all the time", likening the classic hits in Avril's setlist to the 2024 British album 'BRAT' by Charli XCX, as both celebrate their unassuming yet irresistibly catchy nature.

MSN described how "a massive crowd gathered at the Main Stage of Rock Werchter to see Avril Lavigne perform" in Belgium. According to the article, the setlist was "enthusiastically belted out across the field" and "the crowd was instantly captivated, requiring little effort from Lavigne to engage them". Dansende Beren, also described that "Avril drew a massive crowd to the Main Stage for her 'Greatest Hits' tour at the festival" and highlighted how she performed better now than during her last tour in the country.

Laura García Higueras for El Diario discussed the Greatest Hits concert at Mad Cool in Spain: "Avril Lavigne fulfilled her role for the festival's closing." The singer has "reemerged after more than ten years away from the spotlight" to prove she remains "capable of connecting with all generations". The concert received praise, but the review also noted that she was "considerably more limited vocally" compared to previous shows, possibly due to it being the final concert of her European tour leg. Avril's health status was highlighted by Pablo Gil for El Mundo when discussing the same concert. He described the show as "the unexpected rebirth of Avril Lavigne after 10 years of illness, conspiracy theories, and oblivion". It was also noted that "within 10 minutes, the concert had already acquired the status of a significant event", particularly considering "this wave of nostalgia for Avril Lavigne is an unexpected twist that occurs just 10 years after the artist contracted Lyme disease". Ellie Muir, for The Independent, reviewed her concert at Mad Cool in Spain, praising the "pop-punk queen" for "carrying the noughties torch". They highlighted her role in "inspiring girls' grunge phases", with fans responding enthusiastically to her set list featuring hits like "Girlfriend", "Complicated", and "Sk8er Boi". The article compared the event to "the Coachella of Spain". It also commended the festival for effective crowd control, contrasting it favorably with oversold events like Glastonbury, where Avril also performed. This provided fans with "space to dance, no queues, and reliable sunshine". Her concert at the festival earned a rating of 4 out of 5 stars by The Independent.

== Set list ==
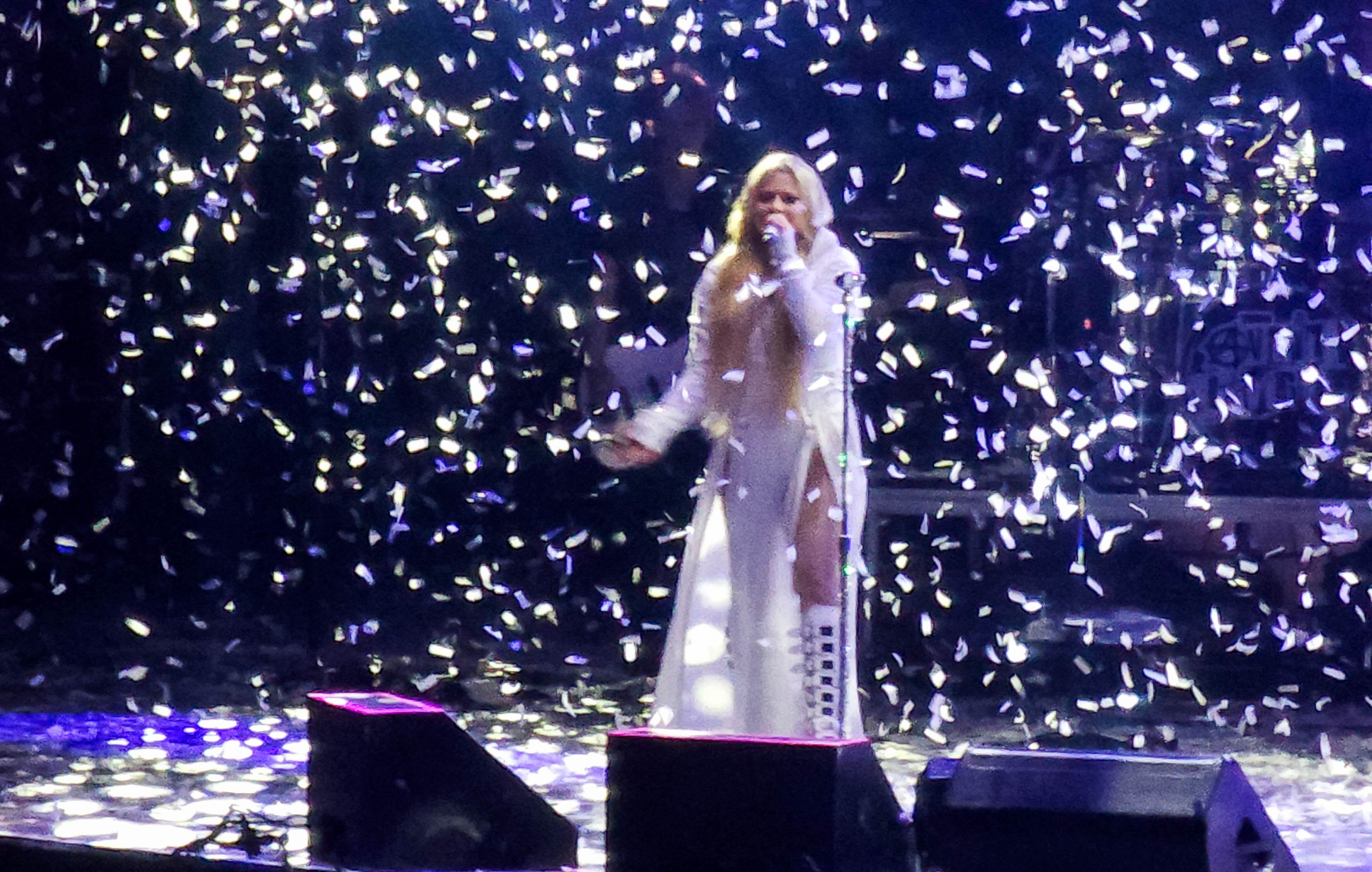
Lavigne performing "I'm with You"

The following set list was taken from the show in Vancouver on May 22, 2024. It does not represent all shows throughout the tour.

1. "Girlfriend"
2. "What the Hell"
3. "Complicated"
4. "Smile"
5. "Here's to Never Growing Up"
6. "My Happy Ending"
7. "He Wasn't"
8. "Don't Tell Me"
9. "When You're Gone"
10. "Fake as Hell"
11. "Bite Me"
12. "Love It When You Hate Me"
13. "Sk8er Boi"
  Encore
14. "Head Above Water"
15. "I'm with You"

=== Alterations ===
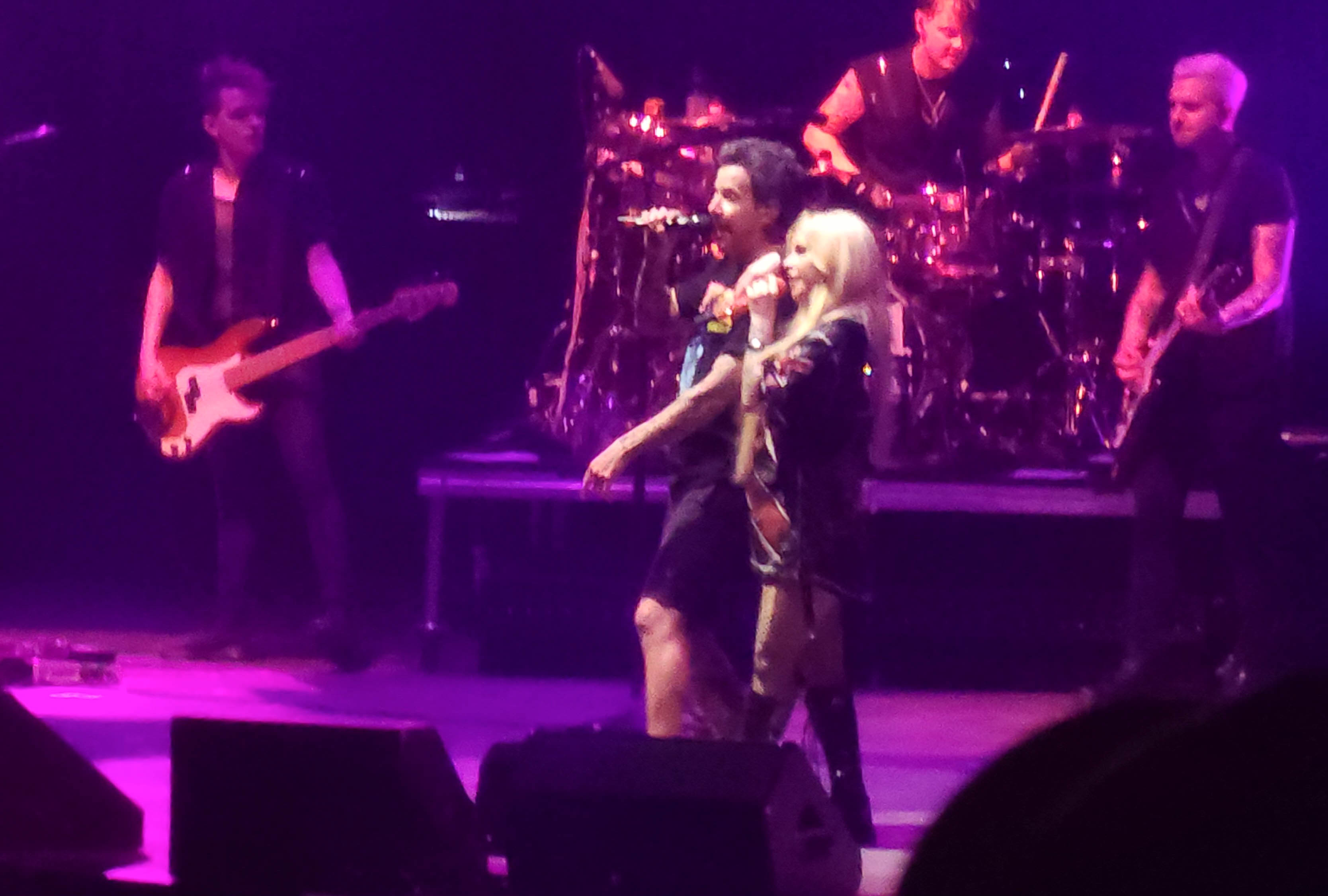
Lavigne performing Simple Plan's "Addicted" with Pierre Bouvier in Toronto, August 16, 2024

- Starting with the second concert in Auburn on May 25, 2024, "Hot" and "Losing Grip" were added to the set list.
- During the Mountain View concert on May 28, 2024, "The Best Damn Thing" was performed.
- During the Las Vegas concert on June 1, 2024, Deryck Whibley joined Lavigne for a cover of Sum 41's "In Too Deep", performed instead of "Smile" as part of the set list.
- During the Pula, Croatia concert on June 17, 2024, Lavigne performed a cover of Blink-182's "All the Small Things".
- During the concert at Pinkpop Festival on June 21, 2024, Yungblud joined Lavigne for a performance of their song "I'm a Mess".
- During the concerts at Hurricane Festival on June 22, 2024, and Southside Festival on June 23, 2024, Pierre Bouvier joined Lavigne for a cover of Simple Plan's "Addicted".

== Tour dates ==
List of 2024 concerts
Date (2024)	City	Country	Venue	Opening acts	Attendance	Revenue
May 22	Vancouver	Canada	Rogers Arena	All Time Low; Royal & The Serpent	12,749	$840,958
May 25	Auburn	United States	White River Amphitheatre	All Time Low; Royal & The Serpent	15,589	$789,645
May 26	Ridgefield	United States	RV Inn Style Resorts Amphitheater	All Time Low; Royal & The Serpent	14,936	$641,237
May 28	Mountain View	United States	Shoreline Amphitheatre	All Time Low; Royal & The Serpent	19,380	$1,004,036
May 30	Inglewood	United States	Kia Forum	All Time Low; Royal & The Serpent	13,402	$1,252,209
June 1	Las Vegas	United States	MGM Grand Garden Arena	All Time Low; Royal & The Serpent	10,645	$1,029,439
June 2	Phoenix	United States	Talking Stick Resort Amphitheatre	All Time Low; Royal & The Serpent	18,242	$789,608
June 14 (Note: The concert was a part of Rock for People.)	Hradec Králové	Czech Republic	Park 360	—N/a	—N/a	—N/a
June 15 (Note: The concert was a part of Nova Rock Festival.)	Nickelsdorf	Austria	Pannonia Fields	—N/a	—N/a	—N/a
June 17	Pula	Croatia	Pula Arena	Kraj Programa	—	—
June 21 (Note: The concert was a part of Pinkpop Festival.)	Landgraaf	Netherlands	Megaland Park	—N/a	—N/a	—N/a
June 22 (Note: The concert was a part of Hurricane Festival.)	Scheeßel	Germany	Eichenring Scheeßel	—N/a	—N/a	—N/a
June 23 (Note: The concert was a part of Southside Festival.)	Neuhausen ob Eck	Germany	TakeOff Gewerbepark	—N/a	—N/a	—N/a
June 27 (Note: The concert was a part of Tinderbox Festival.)	Odense	Denmark	Tusindårsskoven	—N/a	—N/a	—N/a
June 29 (Note: The concert was a part of Summer Sessions Festival.)	Bedford	England	Bedford Park	—N/a	—N/a	—N/a
June 30 (Note: The concert was a part of Glastonbury Festival 2024.)	Pilton	England	Worthy Farm	—N/a	—N/a	—N/a
July 2	Cardiff	Wales	Cardiff Castle	Phem; Simple Plan	—	—
July 3 (Note: The concert was a part of Sounds of the City.)	Manchester	England	Castlefield Bowl	Phem; Simple Plan	—N/a	—N/a
July 6 (Note: The concert was a part of Rock Werchter.)	Werchter	Belgium	Werchter Festivalpark	—N/a	—N/a	—N/a
July 7 (Note: The concert was a part of Main Square Festival.)	Arras	France	Citadelle d'Arras	—N/a	—N/a	—N/a
July 9 (Note: The concert was a part of Independent Days Festival.)	Milan	Italy	Ippodromo La Maura	—N/a	—N/a	—N/a
July 10 (Note: The concert was a part of Festival de Nîmes.)	Nîmes	France	Arênes de Nîmes	—N/a	—N/a	—N/a
July 12 (Note: The concert was a part of Cruïlla Festival.)	Barcelona	Spain	Parc del Fòrum	—N/a	—N/a	—N/a
July 13 (Note: The concert was a part of Mad Cool.)	Madrid	Spain	Villaverde District	—N/a	—N/a	—N/a
August 12	Toronto	Canada	Scotiabank Arena	Simple Plan; Girlfriends	13,802	$1,068,795
August 14	Ottawa	Canada	Canadian Tire Centre	Simple Plan; Girlfriends	12,459	$771,233
August 16	Toronto	Canada	Budweiser Stage	Simple Plan; Girlfriends	15,686	$922,897
August 17 (Note: The concert was a part of International Balloon Festival of Saint-Jean-sur-Richelieu.)	Saint-Jean-sur-Richelieu	Canada	Saint-Jean Airport	—N/a	—N/a	—N/a
August 20	Buffalo	United States	Darien Lake Amphitheater	Simple Plan; Girlfriends	20,322	$885,240
August 21	Hartford	United States	Xfinity Theatre	Simple Plan; Girlfriends	21,502	$846,346
August 23	Holmdel	United States	PNC Bank Arts Center	Simple Plan; Girlfriends	17,239	$811,248
August 24	Mansfield	United States	Xfinity Center	Simple Plan; Girlfriends	19,517	$954,778
August 27	Wantagh	United States	Jones Beach Theater	Simple Plan; Girlfriends	13,200	$632,938
August 29	Camden	United States	Freedom Mortgage Pavilion	Simple Plan; Girlfriends	22,047	$936,503
August 31	Bristow	United States	Jiffy Lube Live	Simple Plan; Girlfriends	20,461	$1,034,418
September 1	Charlotte	United States	PNC Music Pavilion	Simple Plan; Girlfriends	17,615	$898,729
September 3	Alpharetta	United States	Ameris Bank Amphitheatre	Simple Plan; Girlfriends	11,231	$540,892
September 4	Nashville	United States	Ascend Amphitheater	Simple Plan; Girlfriends	6,596	$357,104
September 6	Cuyahoga	United States	Blossom Music Center	Simple Plan; Girlfriends	19,452	$793,792
September 7	Clarkston	United States	Pine Knob Music Theatre	Simple Plan; Girlfriends	14,673	$847,498
September 9	Milwaukee	United States	American Family Insurance Amphitheater	Simple Plan; Girlfriends	13,520	$825,096
September 10	Chicago	United States	Huntington Bank Pavilion	Simple Plan; Girlfriends	8,914	$765,953
September 12	Minneapolis	United States	Minneapolis Armory	Simple Plan; Girlfriends	6,295	$368,080
September 14	Winnipeg	Canada	Canada Life Centre	Simple Plan; Fefe Dobson	11,811	$760,246
September 16	Edmonton	Canada	Rogers Place	Girlfriends; Fefe Dobson	13,588	$895,378
September 18	Calgary	Canada	Scotiabank Saddledome	Girlfriends; Fefe Dobson	12,200	$961,926

List of 2025 concerts
Date (2025)	City	Country	Venue	Opening acts	Attendance	Revenue
May 18	Moncton	Canada	Avenir Centre	Fefe Dobson; We the Kings	—	—
May 20	Halifax	Canada	Scotiabank Centre	Fefe Dobson; We the Kings	—	—
May 24 (Note: The May 24, 2025, concert was a part of Boston Calling Music Festival.)	Boston	United States	Harvard Stadium	—N/a	—N/a	—N/a
May 25	Bangor	United States	Maine Savings Amphitheater	Simple Plan; We the Kings	11,687	$757,857
May 27	Saratoga Springs	United States	Broadview Stage at SPAC	Simple Plan; We the Kings	12,023	$690,871
May 28	Syracuse	United States	Empower Federal Credit Union Amphitheater at Lakeview	Simple Plan; We the Kings	10,190	$553,926
May 30	New York City	United States	Madison Square Garden	Simple Plan; We the Kings	13,039	$1,429,453
June 3	London	Canada	Canada Life Place	Fefe Dobson; We the Kings	8,274	$721,667
June 4	Niagara Falls	Canada	OLG Stage	Fefe Dobson; We the Kings	9,900	$1,217,377
June 5	Niagara Falls	Canada	OLG Stage	Fefe Dobson; We the Kings	9,900	$1,217,377
June 7	Hershey	United States	Hersheypark Stadium	Simple Plan; We the Kings	16,835	$1,121,970
June 8	Cincinnati	United States	Riverbend Music Center	Simple Plan; We the Kings	18,263	$780,597
June 10	Noblesville	United States	Ruoff Music Center	Simple Plan; We the Kings	21,063	$1,077,725
June 12	Maryland Heights	United States	Hollywood Casino Amphitheatre	Simple Plan; We the Kings	18,745	$1,000,921
June 14 (Note: The May 24, 2025, concert was a part of Bonnaroo.)	Manchester	United States	Great Stage Park	—N/a	—N/a	—N/a
June 17	Raleigh	United States	Coastal Credit Union Music Park	Simple Plan; We the Kings	13,239	$731,979
June 18	Charleston	United States	Credit One Stadium	Simple Plan; We the Kings	11,682	$729,465
June 20	Tampa	United States	MidFlorida Credit Union Amphitheatre	Simple Plan; We the Kings	17,161	$1,082,749
June 21	Hollywood	United States	Hard Rock Live	Simple Plan; Fefe Dobson	—	—
June 23	Jacksonville	United States	Daily's Place	Simple Plan; Fefe Dobson	—	—
June 26	Burgettstown	United States	The Pavilion at Star Lake	Simple Plan; We the Kings	16,743	$800,406
June 27	Bethel	United States	Bethel Woods Center for the Arts	Simple Plan; We the Kings	12,556	$532,099
June 29 (Note: The June 29, 2025, concert was a part of All My Friends Fest.)	Oro-Medonte	Canada	Burl's Creek Event Grounds	Simple Plan	—	—
Total					628,473	$36,455,284
