= Greatest Hits (Avril Lavigne album) =

Greatest hits album by Avril Lavigne
- Released: June 21, 2024
- Recorded: 2002–2022
- Length: 69:22
- Label: Legacy

Avril Lavigne chronology
Love Sux (2022)	Greatest Hits (2024)

Greatest Hits is the first greatest hits album by Canadian singer-songwriter Avril Lavigne. It was released on June 21, 2024, by Legacy Recordings to support Lavigne's eighth concert tour, the Greatest Hits Tour. The album includes twenty songs spanning Lavigne's music career since her debut in 2002.

== Background ==
On May 10, 2024, Lavigne announced her plans to release a greatest hits album. On the same day, she posted on social media, stating, "Can't do a greatest hits tour without a greatest hits album", and revealed the album cover, track listing and release date. The album is intended to accompany her eighth concert tour, the Greatest Hits Tour, which commences on May 22, 2024, in Vancouver. The album features 20 songs spanning Lavigne's career, and it includes contributions from Yungblud, Machine Gun Kelly, and Blackbear. Greatest Hits is available on 12" vinyl, CD, and digital formats. The physical formats will feature album packaging with new photographs and a "personal note from [Lavigne] to her fans".

Coinciding with the release of Greatest Hits, Lavigne received several multi-platinum awards from the Recording Industry Association of America (RIAA) for several of her songs in the United States, which are also the first four tracks featured on the compilation. Lavigne earned a three-times platinum certification (3 million) for "Sk8er Boi". "Girlfriend", notably, has received a seven-times platinum award, signifying 7 million in US units (downloads and streaming equivalents). Lavigne also earned four-times platinum awards (4 million) for "What the Hell" and "Complicated". Throughout the release day, new certifications were awarded for other songs included on the album, including: two-times platinum for "My Happy Ending" and "Here's to Never Growing Up" and "When You're Gone", and platinum for "Smile". These new certifications joined her previously awarded Platinum singles, which are also featured on the album, including "I'm with You", "Keep Holding On", and "Head Above Water".

Some other songs are also certified but were not updated in conjunction with the album’s release. These include gold certifications for “Nobody’s Home” (March 29, 2005), “Don’t Tell Me” (October 25, 2004), and “Losing My Grip” (September 22, 2003). These certifications were awarded before the digital and streaming era, when downloads and on-demand streams began to count toward RIAA certification thresholds. Therefore, these songs achieved their certifications almost entirely through physical single sales, highlighting the strong commercial performance of Lavigne’s early releases in a period when industry metrics were more restrictive.

== Reception ==
The Grammys described Lavigne as the "Motherf—in' Princess of Pop-Punk", and "one of the primary artists driving the pop-punk explosion of the 2000s. To celebrate her Greatest Hits compilation album, Glenn Rowley, for The Recording Academy, listed songs that prove Avril's impact in the music industry. Featuring hits from 'Complicated' to 'Bite Me,' the list highlights how Lavigne "broadened her sights beyond the genre she'd helped pioneer." The publication notes that Greatest Hits spans "more than two decades, seven albums, and nearly two dozen hits on the Billboard Hot 100." Her songs "explored everything from power pop to confessional alt-rock to Christian rock", and "when pop-punk's second wave hit at the start of the 2020s, Lavigne made a triumphant return." Ultimately, they describe her as an "artist whose legacy is forever cemented in the pop-punk history books."

Neil Z. Yeung of AllMusic described Avril Lavigne's Greatest Hits as a compilation that "collects two decades of pure, punked-up pop gems." He noted that "with all her most notable songs in one place, her legacy and impact on music in the early 2000s is apparent." Yeung concluded that the album "serves its purpose as a reminder of her undeniable presence in pop music" and acts as a "statement for a singer who is deserving of more credit than she might receive." Ahead of its release, Avril Lavigne embarked on her 'Greatest Hits Tour.' Alexis Petridis from The Guardian reviewed her Glastonbury concert and highlighted the impact of her enduring catalog of hits included in the album compilation and tour setlist: "the idea of Avril Lavigne being widely hailed as a major influence would have been a very peculiar notion to conjure with in 2004, which just goes to show how wrong you can be." He observed that "anyone who wasn’t under her spell in the early 00s might be startled at how robust her songs sound 20 years on. They’re exceptionally well-written, and moreover, there doesn’t seem to be much of a drop-off in musical quality."

== Commercial performance ==
In the United States, Lavigne's Greatest Hits debuted at number 76 on the Billboard 200 with around 12,900 equivalent units in its first tracking period. More than 7,600 copies were of pure sales, which shows that the singer still claims a sizable fan base in North America, as stated by Forbes. In the same country, the collection debuted at number 8 on the Vinyl Albums chart. Forbes analyzed that "the set performed very well, considering Lavigne didn't add any new material to the collection, which may have pushed even more fans to flock to the recently-released project." Greatest Hits performed well in other markets, climbing into the top 100 on major album charts in around 15 countries.

In Japan, the album debuted at number seven on the Oricon Albums chart with 5,022 units sold in its first week. On Oricon's Digital Albums chart the album debuted at number ten in its first week. As of July 2024, the album has sold 8,188 physical copies and 879 digital copies in Japan, respectively.

== Track listing ==
Greatest Hits track listing
No.	Title	Writer(s)	Original album	Length
1.	"Sk8er Boi"	Avril Lavigne; Lauren Christy; Scott Spock; Graham Edwards	Let Go (2002)	3:25
2.	"Girlfriend"	Lavigne; Lukasz Gottwald	The Best Damn Thing (2007)	3:37
3.	"What the Hell"	Lavigne; Max Martin; Shellback	Goodbye Lullaby (2011)	3:39
4.	"Complicated"	Lavigne; Christy; Spock; Edwards	Let Go	4:05
5.	"Don't Tell Me"	Lavigne; Evan Taubenfeld	Under My Skin (2004)	3:26
6.	"I'm a Mess" (with Yungblud)	Lavigne; Dominic Harrison; John Feldmann; Travis Barker	Love Sux (Deluxe) (2022)	3:09
7.	"He Wasn't"	Lavigne; Chantal Kreviazuk	Under My Skin	2:59
8.	"Losing Grip"	Lavigne; Clif Magness	Let Go	3:50
9.	"My Happy Ending"	Lavigne; Butch Walker	Under My Skin	4:03
10.	"Bite Me"	Lavigne; Feldmann; Derek Smith; Omer Fedi; Marshmello	Love Sux	2:39
11.	"Nobody's Home"	Lavigne; Ben Moody	Under My Skin	3:33
12.	"I'm with You"	Lavigne; Christy; Spock; Edwards	Let Go	3:45
13.	"When You're Gone"	Lavigne; Walker	The Best Damn Thing	4:00
14.	"Bois Lie" (featuring Machine Gun Kelly)	Lavigne; Colson Baker; Smith; Feldmann	Love Sux	2:44
15.	"Smile"	Lavigne; Martin; Shellback	Goodbye Lullaby	3:29
16.	"Love It When You Hate Me" (featuring Blackbear)	Lavigne; Feldmann; Smith; Matthew Musto	Love Sux	2:26
17.	"Rock n Roll"	Lavigne; Peter Svensson; Rickard B. Goransson; J Kash; Chad Kroeger; David Hodges	Avril Lavigne (2013)	3:28
18.	"Here's to Never Growing Up"	Lavigne; Martin Johnson; Kroeger; Hodges; Kash	Avril Lavigne	3:36
19.	"Keep Holding On"	Lavigne; Gottwald	The Best Damn Thing and Eragon: Music from the Motion Picture (2006)	4:01
20.	"Head Above Water"	Lavigne; Stephan Moccio; Travis Clark	Head Above Water (2019)	3:40
Total length:				69:22

Japanese edition bonus tracks
No.	Title	Writer(s)	Original album	Length
21.	"Alice" (extended version)	Lavigne	Goodbye Lullaby	5:00
22.	"Hello Kitty"	Lavigne; Kroeger; Hodges; Johnson	Avril Lavigne	3:16
Total length:				77:38

== Charts ==
=== Weekly charts ===
Weekly chart performance for Greatest Hits
Chart (2024–2025)	Peak position
Australian Albums (ARIA)	61
Austrian Albums (Ö3 Austria)	11
Belgian Albums (Ultratop Flanders)	95
Belgian Albums (Ultratop Wallonia)	107
Canadian Albums (Billboard)	59
French Albums (SNEP)	87
German Albums (Offizielle Top 100)	21
Hungarian Physical Albums (MAHASZ)	12
Italian Albums (FIMI)	64
Japanese Albums (Oricon)	7
Japanese Combined Albums (Oricon)	12
Japanese Hot Albums (Billboard Japan)	7
New Zealand Albums (RMNZ)	32
Portuguese Albums (AFP)	35
Scottish Albums (OCC)	8
Spanish Albums (Promusicae)	91
Swiss Albums (Schweizer Hitparade)	47
UK Albums (OCC)	33
US Billboard 200	76

=== Monthly charts ===
Monthly chart performance for Greatest Hits
Chart (2024)	Position
Japanese Albums (Oricon)	32

=== Year-end charts ===
Year-end chart performance for Greatest Hits
Chart (2025)	Position
New Zealand Albums (RMNZ)	45

== Certifications ==
Certifications for Greatest Hits
Region	Certification	Certified units/sales
New Zealand (RMNZ)	Gold	7,500^{‡}
United Kingdom (BPI)	Gold	100,000^{‡}
^{‡} Sales+streaming figures based on certification alone.

== Release history ==
Release dates and formats for Greatest Hits
Region	Date	Formats	Label	Ref.
Various	June 21, 2024	CD; digital download; streaming; vinyl LP	Legacy	
