= Tell Me About Tomorrow =

Studio album by Jxdn
- Released: July 2, 2021
- Genre: Pop-punk
- Length: 44:00
- Labels: DTA; Elektra
- Producers: Travis Barker; Blackbear; Davide Cinci; Andrew Goldstein; Leo Mellace; Keith Varon

Jxdn chronology
Tell Me About Tomorrow (2021)	When the Music Stops (2024)

Singles from Tell Me About Tomorrow
- 1. "Angels & Demons" Released: May 19, 2020; 2. "So What!" Released: July 17, 2020; 3. "Tonight" Released: October 21, 2020; 4. "Better Off Dead" Released: December 18, 2020; 5. "Think About Me" Released: June 4, 2021; 6. "Wanna Be" Released: July 2, 2021

Tell Me About Tomorrow is the debut studio album by American singer and social media personality Jxdn, released through Travis Barker's label, DTA Records, on July 2, 2021.

== Background and recording ==
Jxdn self-released his debut single "Comatose" in February 2020, which caught the attention of Travis Barker who would later sign him to his label DTA Records. After being signed, Jxdn released the single "Angels & Demons" in May 2020 which would serve as the first single from the album. This was followed by the release of the singles "So What!" in July 2020, and "Tonight", featuring Iann Dior, in October 2020.

Jxdn announced the title of the album alongside the release of "Better Off Dead" on December 18, 2020.

On June 4, 2021, Jxdn announced the track listing and release date for the album alongside the album's fifth single, "Think About Me".

The album was released alongside the single and music video for "Wanna Be", featuring Machine Gun Kelly, on July 2, 2021.

With four new tracks, the deluxe edition of the album was released on December 10, 2021.

== Themes and influences ==
Tell Me About Tomorrow's themes focus on growing up and dealing with mental health and self-reflection. Jxdn stated that he has spoken about his experiences with depression and suicidal ideation. The album's sound is heavily inspired by Taking Back Sunday and blink-182.

"A Wasted Year" is related to the hardships caused by the COVID-19 pandemic. It features a chorus similar to "Feeling This" by blink-182. The track is described by Hossler as "a mix between the charisma of Taking Back Sunday and the simplicity of Bleach".

== Critical reception ==
Professional ratings
Review scores
Source	Rating
AllMusic	4/5 stars
Pitchfork	4.6/10

The Aquarian Weekly reviewer Debra Kate Schafer praised the album, stating that it is "fiery in musicality and lyrically poignant", and compared its stylings to "All the Small Things" by blink-182 and "Welcome to Paradise" by Green Day. Writing for Nylon, Sophia June named the record "a collection of earworm pop-punk with propulsive rock guitars and sludgy vocals with pop-punk’s quintessential suburban emo cadence" that "shows that he’s only getting started."

Conversely, Pitchfork reviewer Dani Blum gave the album a negative review and criticized Jxdn's lack of personality on the album, stating "the record tells us nothing about who he is, only who he wants to emulate". Blum went on to say that the fact that Jxdn is new to the punk genre is prominent on the album and criticized the album's multiple mentions of being a rock star, calling it "self-serious satisfaction" alongside declaring the writing as "clunky" and detrimental to the project's purported purpose of raising mental health awareness.

== Track listing ==
No.	Title	Writer(s)	Producer(s)	Length
1.	"Intro"		Travis Barker	0:10
2.	"Pills"	Jaden Hossler; Davide Cinci; Leo Mellace; Barker	Cinci; Mellace; Barker	2:27
3.	"Think About Me"	Hossler; Andrew Goldstein; Branden Steineckert; Jeph Howard; Quinn Allman; Bert McCracken; Barker	Barker	3:24
4.	"Wanna Be" (featuring Machine Gun Kelly)	Hossler; Aaron Jennings; Colson Baker; Barker	Barker	2:38
5.	"A Wasted Year"	Hossler; Goldstein; Mark Hoppus; Tom DeLonge; Barker	Barker	2:37
6.	"Angels & Demons"	Hossler; Keith Varon; McKay Stevens; Barker	Varon; Barker	2:40
7.	"Interlude"		Barker	0:16
8.	"One Minute"	Hossler; Goldstein; Nick Long; Barker	Barker	2:43
9.	"Braindead"	Hossler; Goldstein; Barker	Barker	2:48
10.	"Tonight" (featuring Iann Dior)	Hossler; Aldae; Dru Decaro; Michael Olmo; Nick Bailey; Barker	Barker	2:15
11.	"Fucked Up"	Hossler; Barker	Barker; Garrett Schreiber^{[a]}	2:50
12.	"So What!"	Hossler; John Feldmann; Olivia Marsico; Barker	Barker; Feldmann^{[c]}	2:21
13.	"Angels & Demons Pt. 2"	Hossler; Goldstein; Barker	Barker	1:52
14.	"Better Off Dead"	Hossler; Goldstein; Ari Staprans Leff; Joe Kirkland; Matthew Musto; Barker	Goldstein; Barker; Blackbear	2:35
15.	"DTA"	Hossler; Long; Barker	Barker	2:23
16.	"Last Time"	Hossler; Goldstein; Barker	Barker	3:01
17.	"No Vanity"	Hossler; Goldstein; Barker	Goldstein; Barker	3:25
18.	"Tell Me About Tomorrow"	Hossler; Goldstein; Barker	Barker	3:23
Total length:				43:58

Deluxe edition bonus tracks
No.	Title	Writer(s)	Producer(s)	Length
19.	"Crack My Skull"	Hossler; Goldstein; Barker; Ethan Snoreck	Barker; Whethan	2:54
20.	"Dead or Alive"	Hossler; Goldstein; Barker	Barker	2:31
21.	"Christmas Sucks"	Hossler; Goldstein; Barker	Barker	2:36
22.	"Lips"	Hossler; Goldstein; Barker	Barker	2:49
Total length:				54:50

Notes

- ^{^[c]} signifies a co-producer.
- ^{^[a]} signifies an additional producer.

== Personnel ==
Musicians

- Jxdn – vocals (all tracks), programming (track 4)
- Chris Gehringer – mastering
- Adam Hawkins – mixing
- Travis Barker – programming (tracks 1, 3, 4, 7, 8, 12, 16–18), drums (3–5, 8–11, 13–18), background vocals (4), bass guitar (11, 14)
- Davide Cinci – bass guitar, guitar, programming (track 2)
- Leo Mellace – guitar (track 2)
- Andrew Goldstein – guitar (tracks 3, 8, 9, 13, 16–18), bass guitar (3, 9, 13, 16–18), background vocals (3, 16), autoharp (9)
- Nick Long – guitar (tracks 3, 10, 14, 15)
- Machine Gun Kelly – vocals (track 4)
- Iann Dior – vocals (track 10)
- Garrett Schreiber – guitar (track 11)
- John Feldmann – programming (track 12)

== Charts ==
Chart performance for Tell Me About Tomorrow
Chart (2021)	Peak position
Australian Albums (ARIA)	96
Canadian Albums (Billboard)	83
US Billboard 200	95
US Top Alternative Albums (Billboard)	6
US Top Rock Albums (Billboard)	13
