= Moha La Squale =

French Algerian rapper

Mohamed Bellahmed, better known by his stage name Moha La Squale (French pronunciation: [mɔ.(h)a la skwal]; born in Créteil, France on 24 February 1995) is a French/Algerian rapper. His first name Moha is derived from his birth name Mohamed and La Squale is the nickname of his big brother in the neighborhood. He gained fame through publishing freestyles every Sunday on his Facebook page. Signed to Elektra France, an affiliate of Warner Bros Records, in August 2017, he released his debut album Bendero that topped the French Albums Chart and also charted in Belgium and Switzerland. A great number of the tracks charting on SNEP, the official French Singles Chart.

In July 2018, Lacoste launched a collaboration with Moha La Squale, its first collaboration with a rapper. In September 2020, it was reported that Lacoste had ended its collaboration with Moha La Squale "because his behaviour was no longer consistent with Lacoste’s brand values,” following allegations of sexual assault by several young women on social media.

== Discography ==
=== Albums ===
Title	Year	Peak positions		
Title	Year	FRA	BEL (Wa)	SWI
Bendero	2018	1	5	41
L'Appache	2022	—	34	—

=== Singles ===
Title	Year	Peak positions			Album
Title	Year	FRA	BEL (Wa)	SWI	Album
"Bandolero"	2018	14	13 (Ultratip*)	—	Bendero
"Luna"	2018	25	16 (Ultratip*)	—	Bendero
"Ma belle"	2019	1	20	39	Non-album singles
"Santa Monica"	2019	69	—	—	Non-album singles
"Inspi du soir"	2019	72	—	—	Non-album singles
"Ma rue n'est pas à vendre"	2019	156	—	—	Non-album singles
"Chez babou"	2020	85	—	—	Non-album singles

*Did not appear in the official Belgian Ultratop 50 charts, but rather in the bubbling under Ultratip charts.

=== Other charted songs ===
Title	Year	Peak positions		Album
Title	Year	FRA	BEL (Wa)	Album
"Bienvenue à la banane"	2018	40	26 (Ultratip*)	Bendero
"M'appelle pas mon frérot"	2018	71	—	Bendero
"Pas comme eux"	2018	91	—	Bendero
"Midi minuit"	2018	139	—	Bendero
"Rémi sans famille"	2018	148	—	Bendero
"Pour la 20ème"	2018	154	—	Bendero
"T'étais où?"	2018	159	—	Bendero
"Ma fable"	2018	172	—	Bendero
"Rappelle-toi"	2018	185	—	Bendero
"Papa Noël"	2018	173	—	Bendero
"La BP"	2018	59	—	Bendero
"C'était pas gagné"	2018	45	—	Bendero
"Snow"	2018	54	—	Bendero
"Bendero"	2018	56	—	Bendero
"Bonnie & Clyde"	2018	65	—	Bendero
"Le p'tit avait un rêve"	2018	76	—	Bendero
"J'me rappelle papa"	2018	86	—	Bendero
"Il le fallait"	2018	89	—	Bendero
"Prologue [2018]"	2018	92	—	Bendero
"René Croco"	2018	115	—	Bendero
"Pankani"	2018	124	—	Bendero
"J'me balade"	2018	129	—	Bendero
"C'était la ure"	2018	143	—	Bendero
"5 juillet 1962"	2018	145	—	Bendero
"Déçu"	2018	153	—	Bendero
"On n'est pas les mêmes"	2018	155	—	Bendero
"J'était pas prêt"	2018	175	—	Bendero
"Pour les jaja"	2018	178	—	Bendero
"24 solo"	2018	182	—	Bendero

*Did not appear in the official Belgian Ultratop 50 charts, but rather in the bubbling under Ultratip charts.
