= DTA Records =

American record label founded by Travis Barker

- Parent company: Warner Music Group
- Founded: December 13, 2019; 6 years ago
- Founder: Travis Barker
- Distributors: 300 Elektra Entertainment (in the US); Warner Music Group (outside the US)
- Genre: Hip hop; rock; pop punk
- Country of origin: United States
- Official website: dtarecords.com elektra.com/dtarecords

DTA Records (an initialism for "Don't Trust Anyone") is an American record label founded in December 2019 by Travis Barker, best known as the drummer of Blink-182. It is a joint partnership between Barker and Elektra Entertainment (a label group owned by Warner Music Group), which distributes the label's releases.

== History ==
=== Formation (2019) ===
It’s just being able to see things through and make sure you don’t hear of the stories you so often do about artists getting signed to a label. Maybe someone doesn’t pick the best first single and it doesn’t work right away, and then the next thing you know, the artist is dropped and his project is in limbo. I’m just trying to protect that whole process where they won’t be dropped for exploring new sounds.

— Travis Barker

DTA Records was founded in 2019 as a partnership between Travis Barker and Elektra Music Group (now known as Elektra Entertainment, following its merger into 300 Elektra Entertainment). The label was conceived after Johnny Minardi, an Atlantic Records employee and acquaintance of Barker, told Barker of Elektra Music Group's co-president Gregg Nadel's desire to start a new record label with him. Minardi offered Barker a deal which allowed him and Nadel to help develop new artists together. Barker was already well acquainted with Warner Music Group, with his old record label, LaSalle Records, formerly being distributed through Atlantic, and more recently, he had played drums for or produced albums for various artists associated with WMG's labels, such as Fever 333, grandson and Jasiah.

Barker's vision for DTA Records was to use the label to develop up and coming artists, and guarantee them greater security and freedoms on the label. "As an artist, it's important to me that an artist's vision is protected at all costs. It's crucial that I'm able to look an artist in the eye and believe it when I say we can take them from a basement to an arena." However, Barker is extremely selective about the artists he signs to DTA, stating; “It has to be someone I feel comfortable taking a picture with and co-signing, saying I believe in this person and I think that this person is going to change music or at least make a huge fucking dent in music. I just don’t want to sign some random person.” DTA Records, while also acting as an artist development label for Barker, also acts as a hub for Travis Barker and his collaborations with other artists.

The formation of DTA Records was announced on December 13, 2019. The same day, DTA released its first single, "Gimme Brain", a collaboration between Barker, Lil Wayne and Rick Ross.

=== Jaden Hossler, Avril Lavigne, Ho99o9 and continued growth (2020–present) ===
In May 2020, Jaden Hossler (then known as jxdn) became the first signing to the DTA Records label, following the success of his debut single "Comatose". His first release on the label, the single "Angels & Demons" became a viral hit on TikTok and became DTA Records' first release to be certified Gold by the Recording Industry Association of America (RIAA), which it attained on July 2, 2021. His debut album, Tell Me About Tomorrow, was DTA's first studio album release, and reached number 95 on the Billboard 200 Chart.

On November 3, 2021, Canadian pop-punk singer Avril Lavigne announced she had signed to DTA Records. She released her first single for DTA, "Bite Me", on November 9, 2021. Lavigne released her first album through DTA, Love Sux, on February 25, 2022; it became DTA's first top-10 album on the Billboard 200 Chart, reaching number nine.

On January 20, 2022, the punk rock band Ho99o9 (pronounced Horror) released the single "Battery Not Included" through DTA; their first album since 2017's United States of Horror, titled SKIN, was produced by Travis Barker and released on March 11, 2022.

== Roster ==
Current artists
- Landon Barker
- Travis Barker
- Caspr
- Kim Kardashian
- Deyaz
Past Artists
- Ho99o9
- Avril Lavigne
- Jxdn

== Discography ==
Discography of DTA Records
Year	Release date	Artist / Band	Release	Type / Format	Notes	Cite
2019	December 13, 2019	Travis Barker, Lil Wayne and Rick Ross	"Gimme Brain"	Single	First release	
2020	April 10, 2020	Travis Barker, Jasiah and NASCAR Aloe	"Dogshit"	Single		
2020	May 18, 2020	jxdn	"Angels & Demons"	Single	RIAA: Gold	
2020	May 29, 2020	Travis Barker and Wiz Khalifa	"Drums Drums Drums"	Single		
2020	June 23, 2020	jxdn	"Angels & Demons (Acoustic)"	Single		
2020	July 16, 2020	jxdn (featuring Travis Barker)	"So What!"	Single		
2020	July 31, 2020	Travis Barker and Run the Jewels	"Forever"	Single		
2020	August 20, 2020	jxdn	"Pray"	Single		
2020	October 16, 2020	jxdn	"So What! (Acoustic)"	Single		
2020	October 21, 2020	jxdn (featuring Iann Dior)	"Tonight"	Single		
2020	December 18, 2020	jxdn	"Better Off Dead"	Single		
2021	January 19, 2021	jxdn	"Driver's License"	Single	Olivia Rodrigo cover	
2021	June 4, 2021	jxdn	"Think About Me"	Single		
2021	July 2, 2021	jxdn (featuring Machine Gun Kelly)	"Wanna Be"	Single		
2021	July 2, 2021	jxdn	Tell Me About Tomorrow	CD/LP/DD	First album release	
2021	July 17, 2021	jxdn	"Angels & Demons/Driver's License"	12" single	Record Store Day exclusive	
2021	November 9, 2021	Avril Lavigne	"Bite Me"	Single		
2021	November 17, 2021	jxdn	"Happy Holidays, You Bastard"	Single	Blink-182 cover (Spotify Singles)	
2021	December 3, 2021	jxdn	Tell Me About Tomorrow (Deluxe)	DD	Deluxe edition	
2021	December 17, 2021	Avril Lavigne	"Bite Me (Acoustic)"	Single		
2022	January 13, 2022	Avril Lavigne (featuring blackbear)	"Love It When You Hate Me"	Single		
2022	January 20, 2022	Ho99o9	"Battery Not Included"	Single		
2022	February 11, 2022	Ho99o9	"Nuge Snight"	Single		
2022	February 25, 2022	Avril Lavigne	Love Sux	CD/CS/LP/DD	First top-10 album on Billboard 200	
2022	March 11, 2022	Ho99o9	SKIN	DD		
2022	March 11, 2022	Ho99o9 (featuring Corey Taylor)	"Bite My Face"	Single		
2022	June 24, 2022	Avril Lavigne	Spotify Singles	Single		
2022	June 28, 2022	jxdn	28 (Songs For Cooper)	EP		
2022	August 26, 2022	Avril Lavigne (featuring Machine Gun Kelly)	"Bois Lie" (Acoustic)	Single		
2022	November 3, 2022	Avril Lavigne and Yungblud	"I'm a Mess"	Single		
2022	November 11, 2022	jxdn	"Sober"	Single		
2022	November 25, 2022	Avril Lavigne	Love Sux (Deluxe)	DD	Deluxe edition	
2023	March 3, 2023	jxdn	"Friends With Benefits"	Single		
2023	June 8, 2023	jxdn	"Elevated Heartbreak"	Single		
2023	September 22, 2023	Landon Barker	"Friends With Your Ex"	Single		
2023	October 6, 2023	Jaden Hossler	"Chrome Hearted"	Single		
2024	February 8, 2024	jxdn	"When the Music Stops"	Single		
2024	December 23, 2024	Kim Kardashian	"Santa Baby"	Single	Eartha Kitt with Henri René and His Orchestra cover	

== See also ==
- LaSalle Records, Travis Barker's first record label
- Travis Barker discography
