= Love Sux =

- Standard edition cover

Studio album by Avril Lavigne
- Released: February 25, 2022
- Recorded: November 2020 – February 2021
- Genres: Pop-punk; alternative rock; skate-punk; emo pop
- Length: 33:29
- Labels: Elektra; DTA
- Producers: Travis Barker; John Feldmann; Derek "Mod Sun" Smith

Avril Lavigne chronology
Head Above Water (2019)	Love Sux (2022)	Greatest Hits (2024)

Singles from Love Sux
- 1. "Bite Me" Released: November 10, 2021; 2. "Love It When You Hate Me" Released: January 14, 2022

Love Sux is the seventh studio album by Canadian singer-songwriter Avril Lavigne, released on February 25, 2022, by DTA and distributed by Elektra Records, as her only album on those labels. Musically, it embraces emo pop angst and Lavigne's early skate punk influences from Blink-182, Green Day, NOFX and the Offspring. The album features collaborations with Machine Gun Kelly, Blackbear and Mark Hoppus of Blink-182.

Preceded by the singles "Bite Me" and "Love It When You Hate Me", Love Sux received generally positive reviews from music critics, who praised Lavigne's attitude and noted it as a return to form for the singer. It debuted at number nine on US Billboard 200 with 30,000 equivalent-album units, of which 19,000 were pure album sales. It also entered the top ten in Australia, Germany, Canada, Japan, and the United Kingdom, among many others. Lavigne promoted Love Sux through a series of public appearances and televised performances. The album was nominated for Album of the Year at the Juno Awards of 2023.

A deluxe edition of the album was released on November 25, 2022, following the release of the single "I'm a Mess", a collaboration with British singer Yungblud. Love Sux won the Japan Gold Disc Award of Best 3 Albums.

== Background and development ==
Following the release of her previous studio album Head Above Water (2019), Lavigne mentioned in a May 2020 interview with American Songwriter magazine that she would like to release some music in 2021 and that she had started working on new material. At the time, Lavigne was without a record label or management team. She began working on new music, collaborating with American musician Travis Barker. The pair produced their first song, "F.U.", in November 2020. The same month, American musician Mod Sun, on whose single "Flames" Lavigne featured in January 2021, introduced Lavigne to producer John Feldmann, who stated "my experience with Avril was unbelievable" adding that "her voice is incredible — her pitch, her tone."

In December 2020, Lavigne confirmed she was recording new music with Feldmann, Barker, Mod Sun, and Machine Gun Kelly. Recording for the album was reportedly completed by February 2021, and on November 3, 2021, Lavigne announced that she had signed with Barker's label, DTA Records. On January 13, 2022, Lavigne revealed the title of her seventh studio album, along with the release date of February 25, 2022.

Four of the tracks of Love Sux are vocal collaborations with other artists, namely Machine Gun Kelly, Blackbear, Mark Hoppus and Yungblud; this is the largest amount of collaborations Lavigne had ever included on an album. On working with Hoppus, Lavigne said "...he blew me away... He was writing in front of me, recording his vocals, playing his bass. He can engineer and he's obviously an awesome songwriter and I got to see that firsthand. I have so much respect for him that I just keep gushing about him."

== Composition and themes ==
=== Music and lyrics ===
Love Sux was described by Lavigne in an interview with Entertainment Weekly as the "most alternative record I've made from front to back", further explaining "most of my albums have like pop songs, ballads, and it's quite diverse. The people I worked with really understood me and come from that genre of music". She described the recording of the album as feeling as though she was "back in high school hanging out with the type of people [she] grew up with, and it was just effortless." In an interview with Nylon, Lavigne said that "the album is light and happy, even though there's songs about heartbreak and breaking up" but that "it's also anthemic, and it's powerful, and it has a positive message for people to stand up for yourself, to have self-worth." She further stated that Love Sux is the album she had "wanted to make for [her] whole career," drawing skate punk influences from NOFX, Blink-182, Green Day and the Offspring.

The album has been described by critics as being pop-punk, skate-punk, alternative rock and emo.

=== Songs ===
Love Sux opens with the track "Cannonball", described by Ali Shutler of NME as "a furious electro dance opener" which "starts with a burst of buoyant guitars and the angsty scream of "like a ticking time bomb, I'm about to explode" and that "less than 20 seconds in, the tune veers drastically into hyper-pop territory". The second track "Bois Lie" features American musician Machine Gun Kelly, and was described by Bobby Olivier of Spin as a "speedy duet" which "builds to a he-said-she-said climax", and as "a sonic sequel to MGK's "Forget Me Too"".

"Bite Me" is the album's third track and lead single, and has drawn comparisons to Lavigne's earlier studio albums Let Go (2002) and The Best Damn Thing (2007), as well as to the band Paramore. Billboard described it as a "guitar- and drum-heavy track" which "features Lavigne raging at her former lover for failing to treat her properly, promising that they'll always regret being kicked out of her life." Fourth track and second single "Love It When You Hate Me" was described by Shutner as a "pop-punk banger", and Emily Carter writing for Kerrang! noted that the song "hears the Canadian star embracing nostalgic pop-punk in the chorus – 'The highs the lows the yes, the nos / You're so hot when you get cold / Don't call me baby / I love it when you hate me' – and fresher elements in the verses." The title track "Love Sux" follows as the album's fifth track, and was described by Tom Williams of The Line of Best Fit as featuring "a fantastic guitar-riff that recalls Celebrity Skin-era Hole".

"Kiss Me like the World Is Ending" is the sixth track, which was said by Jessie Atkinson of Gigwise to contain a guitar riff reminiscent of Blink-182's "All the Small Things". Seventh track "Avalanche" was described by Shutler as "find[ing] Lavigne, now 37, just as confused as she was on her 2002 breakout track "Complicated", featuring the lyrics "I wish my life came with instructions" but that "with a delicious, synth-driven breakdown, she's far more self-assured here." 10th track "All I Wanted", featuring Mark Hoppus, "sees the two punk veterans trade in various past memories for a surprisingly affecting number". 11th track "Dare to Love Me" is a "delicate ballad" containing "fraught emotion", and was described by Atkinson as a "piano led beauty". "Break of a Heartache" is the album's 12th and final track, and was said by Shannon Garner of Clash to be a "bombastic number that confidently brushes off past trauma and reassures people that you can overcome things and change how you feel towards certain situations given the time."

== Promotion ==
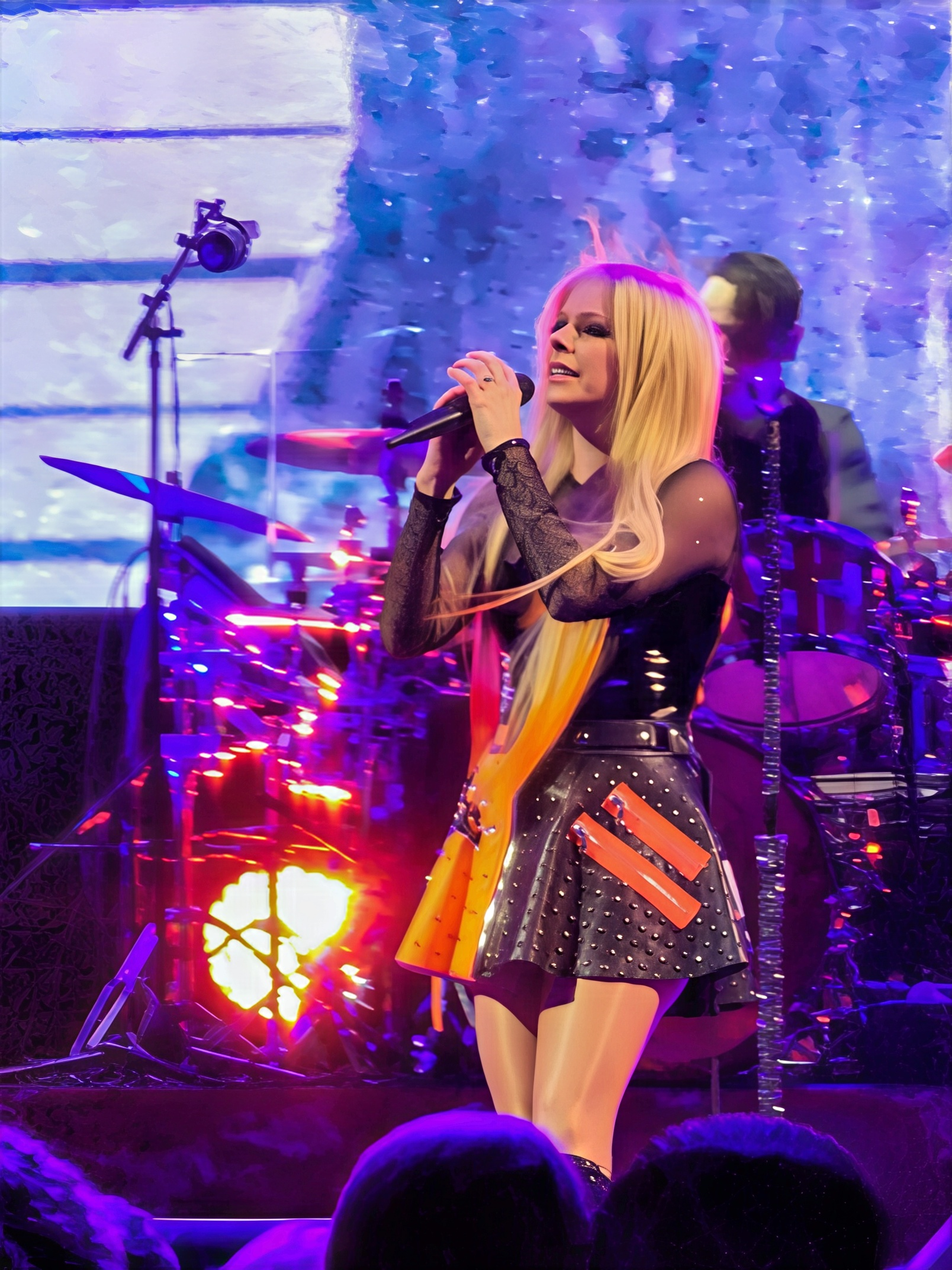
Lavigne performing at Caesars Windsor during the Love Sux tour in May 2022

Lavigne held a concert and launch party at the Roxy Theater in New York City, celebrating with Machine Gun Kelly and Travis Barker. She performed several songs from the album, including "Bite Me", "Love It When You Hate Me", and "Bois Lie" (with Machine Gun Kelly), as well as some of her earlier hits.

=== Singles ===
The lead single from Love Sux, "Bite Me", was released on November 10, 2021. The second single, "Love It When You Hate Me", featuring Blackbear, was released on January 14, 2022. An acoustic version of "Bois Lie", featuring Machine Gun Kelly, was released as a promotional single on August 26, 2022. A music video for this song was released on YouTube the same day, featuring footage from Machine Gun Kelly's Mainstream Sellout Tour, on which Lavigne was a supporting act.

=== Tour ===
To promote the album, Lavigne embarked on the Love Sux Tour, originally titled the Bite Me Tour, in 2022. The European leg was originally scheduled for that year, but was delayed to 2023 due to the ongoing COVID-19 pandemic. In addition, the pandemic also delayed some dates in the Canadian leg due to positive cases within the tour and subsequent exposures.

== Critical reception ==
Professional ratings
Aggregate scores
Source	Rating
AnyDecentMusic?	6.8/10
Metacritic	74/100
Review scores
Source	Rating
AllMusic	4/5 stars
Clash	8/10
Gigwise	6/10 stars
The Guardian	3/5 stars
The Independent	3/5 stars
Kerrang!	4/5 stars
The Line of Best Fit	6/10
MusicOMH	4/5 stars
NME	3/5 stars
Rolling Stone	4/5 stars

Love Sux received generally positive reviews from music critics. At Metacritic, which assigns a normalized rating out of 100 to reviews from mainstream critics, the album has an average score of 74 based on 11 reviews. This marks Lavigne's highest-rated album of her career to date.

In a positive review from Clash, Shannon Garner wrote that "it would be easy to disregard Lavigne's album as part of the current 2000s nostalgia storm that's on the rise but it's far from hazy nostalgia", further remarking that Love Sux "showcases growth in Lavigne as an artist", and that the album is "more of an antidote to pop progress rather than a nostalgic throwback", concluding that "it just has all the elements of what made us fall in love with Avril Lavigne in the first place." Tom Williams of The Line of Best Fit complimented Love Sux, commenting that the album "brings the energy up to a 10 almost immediately and rarely turns it down across the album's 33 minutes."

Roisin O'Connor of The Independent wrote that the album is "Lavigne's best album since 2007's The Best Damn Thing, which moved away from her earlier grunge-based sound and into catchier territory. It says a lot about the 37-year-old's conviction that her rebel-girl schtick doesn't feel hackneyed." While critical of some of the album's lyrics, O'Connor concluded that Love Sux is "shameless but cathartic hit of nostalgia". Writing for NME, Ali Shutler reviewed Love Sux positively, remarking that the album "is an unapologetic blast of self-empowerment" and "a progressive pop-punk album that eschews the old rules – but not at the expense of maximalist, joyful guitar anthems." Hannah Jane Parkinson of The Guardian opined that the album contains "high-energy bangers one after the other", and is "exuberant enough to have you partying like it's 2002."

In a less positive review, Jessie Atkinson of Gigwise commented, "now thirty-seven years old, Avril is still playing with schoolbook colloquialisms and the dramas of one who is unlucky in love. The results are undeniably fun, especially for those of us who were young at the time of 2002's Let Go – and the new youth, who are dabbling in chequered wrist warmers and smudged liner. Sadly, Love Sux sounds too much like a 2002 carbon copy to truly impress in 2022."

=== Accolades ===
Love Sux won the Japan Gold Disc Award of Best 3 Albums. The album was nominated for Album of the Year and Pop Album of the Year at the Juno Awards of 2023.

Industry awards
Organization	Year	Award	Result	Ref.
Japan Gold Disc Awards	2023	Best 3 Albums	Won	
Juno Awards	2023	Album of the Year	Nominated	
Juno Awards	2023	Pop Album of the Year	Nominated	

== Commercial performance ==
In Canada, Love Sux debuted at number three on the Billboard Canadian Albums chart; it was Lavigne's seventh album to enter the top ten on the chart. In Australia the album debuted at number three on the ARIA Albums Chart, becoming Lavigne's seventh top-ten album in the country and her highest-charting album since Goodbye Lullaby in 2011. In Germany, Love Sux debuted at number six on Offizielle Deutsch Chart, becoming her sixth top-ten album in the country. In the United Kingdom, the album debuted at number three on the UK Albums chart, with 13,622 units sold on its first week, making it her highest position on the chart since her 2007 album The Best Damn Thing. Love Sux was also the best-selling female cassette of 2022, and third overall.

In the United States, Love Sux debuted at number nine on the Billboard 200 chart with 30,000 album-equivalent units on its first week, which consisted of 19,000 pure copies and 10,000 streaming units. It became Lavigne's sixth top-ten effort overall and her first since her 2013 self-titled record. The album went straight to number two on the Billboard Top Album Sales chart. It was the second best selling album that week, debuting at number two on the Top Rock Albums and Top Alternative Albums charts; it was also Lavigne's first album to enter the Top Rock Albums chart and her highest position on the Top Alternative Albums chart since 2007.

In Japan, Love Sux debuted at number seven on the Oricon Japanese Albums chart, with 11,573 units sold on its first week (9,882 physical copies and 1,252 digital copies), making it Lavigne's seventh studio album to enter the top ten in Japan. On the Billboard Japanese Hot Albums chart, the album debuted at number six. Uniquely in Japan, the album was released by Sony Music instead of DTA and Elektra Records. Love Sux was the 67th most downloaded album in Japan in 2022. In November, the vinyl edition release of Love Sux debuted at number 24 on the UK Vinyl Albums Chart.

== Track listing ==
All tracks were produced by Travis Barker, John Feldmann and Derek "Mod Sun" Smith, unless otherwise noted.

Standard edition
No.	Title	Writer(s)	Producer(s)	Length
1.	"Cannonball"	Avril Lavigne; John Feldmann; Derek "Mod Sun" Smith		2:18
2.	"Bois Lie" (featuring Machine Gun Kelly)	Lavigne; Feldmann; Smith; Colson Baker		2:43
3.	"Bite Me"	Lavigne; Feldmann; Smith; Omer Fedi; Marshmello		2:39
4.	"Love It When You Hate Me" (featuring Blackbear)	Lavigne; Feldmann; Smith; Matthew Musto		2:25
5.	"Love Sux"	Lavigne; Feldmann; Smith		2:48
6.	"Kiss Me Like the World Is Ending"	Lavigne; Feldmann; Smith		2:50
7.	"Avalanche"	Lavigne; Feldmann; Smith	Mod Sun; Feldmann	3:39
8.	"Déjà Vu"	Lavigne; Feldmann; Smith	Mod Sun; Feldmann	3:23
9.	"F.U."	Lavigne; Barker; Nick Long	Barker	2:47
10.	"All I Wanted" (featuring Mark Hoppus of Blink-182)	Lavigne; Feldmann; Smith; Mark Hoppus		2:32
11.	"Dare to Love Me"	Lavigne	Mod Sun; Feldmann	3:34
12.	"Break of a Heartache"	Lavigne	Mod Sun; Feldmann	1:51
Total length:				33:29

Japanese standard and tour edition (bonus track)
No.	Title	Writer(s)	Length
13.	"Bite Me" (acoustic)	Lavigne; Feldmann; Smith; Fedi; Marshmello	3:09
Total length:			36:38

Deluxe edition (bonus tracks)
No.	Title	Writer(s)	Producer(s)	Length
13.	"I'm a Mess" (with Yungblud)	Lavigne; Dominic Harrison; Feldmann; Barker	Feldmann; Barker	3:07
14.	"Mercury in Retrograde"	Lavigne; Feldmann; Smith	Mod Sun; Feldmann	2:09
15.	"Bite Me" (acoustic)	Lavigne; Feldmann; Smith; Fedi; Marshmello		3:09
16.	"Love It When You Hate Me" (acoustic; featuring Blackbear)	Lavigne; Feldmann; Smith; Musto		2:33
17.	"Bois Lie" (acoustic; featuring Machine Gun Kelly)	Lavigne; Feldmann; Smith; Baker		2:50
18.	"Pity Party"	Lavigne; Feldmann; Smith	Mod Sun; Feldmann	1:54
Total length:				49:11

Japan tour edition (bonus disc)
No.	Title	Writer(s)	Producer(s)	Length
1.	"Complicated"	Lavigne; Lauren Christy; Scott Spock; Graham Edwards	The Matrix	4:04
2.	"Girlfriend"	Lavigne; Lukasz Gottwald	Dr. Luke	3:36
3.	"I'm with You"	Lavigne; Christy; Spock; Edwards	The Matrix	3:43
4.	"My Happy Ending"	Lavigne; Butch Walker	Walker	4:02
5.	"Sk8er Boi"	Lavigne; Christy; Spock; Edwards	The Matrix	3:24
6.	"What the Hell"	Lavigne; Max Martin; Shellback	Martin; Shellback	3:39
7.	"Head Above Water"	Lavigne; Stephan Moccio; Travis Clark	Moccio	3:40
8.	"Here's to Never Growing Up"	Lavigne; Martin Johnson; Chad Kroeger; David Hodges; Jacob Kasher	Johnson	3:34
9.	"Losing Grip"	Lavigne; Clif Magness	Magness	3:53
10.	"Smile"	Lavigne; Martin; Shellback	Martin; Shellback	3:29
11.	"Hello Kitty"	Lavigne; Johnson; Kroeger; Hodges	Johnson	3:17
12.	"Complicated" (from The First Take)	Lavigne; Christy; Spock; Edwards		4:03
13.	"Bite Me" (from The First Take)	Lavigne; Feldmann; Smith; Fedi; Marshmello		3:07
Total length:				47:31

== Personnel ==
Credits adapted from the liner notes of Love Sux.

Musicians

- Avril Lavigne – vocals, guitar (12)
- John Feldmann – bass, guitar
- Dylan McLean – additional bass, additional guitar
- Michael Bono – additional bass, additional guitar
- Scot Stewart – additional bass, additional guitar
- Travis Barker – drums (1–6, 9–10)
- Machine Gun Kelly – vocals (2)
- Blackbear – vocals (4)
- Mod Sun – drums (7–8, 11–12)
- Mark Hoppus – vocals (10)

Production

- John Feldmann – production (1–8, 10–12)
- Mod Sun – production (1–8, 10–12)
- Travis Barker – production (1–6, 9–10)
- Cameron Mizell – additional production (1–8, 10–12)
- Dylan McLean – additional production (1–8, 10–12)
- Hero DeLano – additional production (1–8, 10–12)
- Josh Thornberry – additional production (1–8, 10–12)
- Michael Bono – additional production (1–8, 10–12)
- Scot Stewart – additional production (1–8, 10–12)

Technical

- Chris Gehringer – mastering
- Adam Hawkins – mixing (1–3, 5–6, 8, 10, 12)
- Manny Marroquin – mixing (4)
- Neal Avron – mixing (7, 11)
- Cameron Mizell – additional engineer (1–8, 10–12)
- Dylan McLean – engineer (1–8, 10–12)
- Hero DeLano – additional engineer (1–8, 10–12)
- Josh Thornberry – additional engineer (1–8, 10–12)
- Michael Bono – additional engineer (1–8, 10–12)
- Scot Stewart – engineer (1–8, 10–12)
- Kevin Thrash – engineer (9), additional engineer (2–6, 10)
- Andrew Goldstein – additional engineer (4)

Design

- Alex Kirzhner – art direction
- Sam Jennings – artwork, package design
- Joe Termini – photography

== Charts ==
=== Weekly charts ===
Weekly chart performance for Love Sux
Chart (2022)	Peak position
Australian Albums (ARIA)	3
Austrian Albums (Ö3 Austria)	3
Belgian Albums (Ultratop Flanders)	10
Belgian Albums (Ultratop Wallonia)	9
Canadian Albums (Billboard)	3
Croatian International Albums (HDU)	24
Czech Albums (ČNS IFPI)	36
Dutch Albums (Album Top 100)	23
French Albums (SNEP)	70
German Albums (Offizielle Top 100)	6
Hungarian Albums (MAHASZ)	7
Irish Albums (Official Charts)	19
Italian Albums (FIMI)	22
Japanese Albums (Oricon)	7
Japanese Hot Albums (Billboard Japan)	6
New Zealand Albums (RMNZ)	19
Polish Albums (ZPAV)	29
Portuguese Albums (AFP)	13
Scottish Albums (Official Charts)	4
Spanish Albums (Promusicae)	14
Swiss Albums (Schweizer Hitparade)	7
UK Albums (Official Charts)	3
US Billboard 200	9
US Top Alternative Albums (Billboard)	2
US Top Rock Albums (Billboard)	2

=== Year-end charts ===
Year-end chart performance for Love Sux
Chart (2022)	Position
Japanese Download Albums (Billboard Japan)	67
UK Cassette Albums (OCC)	11
US Top Alternative Albums (Billboard)	45

== Release history ==
Release history for Love Sux
Region	Date	Format(s)	Version	Label(s)	Ref.
Various	February 25, 2022	Cassette; CD; digital download; streaming	Standard	Elektra; DTA	
Japan	February 25, 2022	CD	Japanese	Sony Music Japan	
Japan	November 2, 2022	CD; digital download; streaming	Japan tour	Sony Music Japan	
Various	November 25, 2022	Vinyl	Standard	Elektra; DTA	
Various	November 25, 2022	Digital download; streaming	Deluxe	Elektra; DTA	
