= 300 Elektra Entertainment =

Umbrella label group owned by Warner Music Group

- Parent company: Warner Music Group
- Founded: June 22, 2022; 4 years ago
- Founder: Warner Music Group
- Defunct: October 31, 2024; 21 months ago
- Genre: Various
- Country of origin: United States

300 Elektra Entertainment (3EE) was an umbrella label group owned by Warner Music Group. It existed as a merger of 300 Entertainment and Elektra Music Group, along with its respectively owned labels.

The umbrella label described itself as "[having] the mindset of an independent and the muscle of a major".

On October 31, 2024, 300 Elektra Entertainment merged with Atlantic Records, though still retaining imprints on releases.

== History ==
A merger between 300 Entertainment and Elektra Music Group had long been planned by Warner Music Group, and during WMG's purchase of 300 Entertainment for US$400 million on December 16, 2021, both parties agreed that 300 would be merged with other Warner Music Group labels. Furthermore, the label's CEO Kevin Liles was made head of both Elektra Music Group and 300 Entertainment.

On June 22, 2022, Warner Music Group announced the creation of 300 Elektra Entertainment (3EE), created from the merger of Elektra Music Group and 300 Entertainment; both of the label's respective subsidiaries were taken under the umbrella as a result. Despite this merger, WMG maintains that 300 and Elektra will be keeping their identities. As Kevin Liles took over as 3EE's Chairman and CEO, Rayna Bass and Selim Bouab were appointed co-presidents at 300 Entertainment, with Mike Easterlin and Gregg Nadel continuing to act as co-presidents at the newly renamed Elektra Entertainment.

The umbrella label's logo is a merger of the logo of 300 Entertainment and the 1990’s Elektra Entertainment Group logo.

== Labels ==
- 300 Entertainment
- 300 Studios
- DCD2 Records
- DTA Records
- Elektra Records
- Fueled by Ramen
- Low Country Sound
- Parlophone
- Public Consumption
- Roadrunner Records
- Sparta
- YSL Records

== Elektra France ==
Elektra France
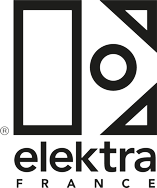
- Parent company: Atlantic Music Group; Warner Music France
- Founded: 2016
- Founder: Fally Ipupa
- Distributors: Warner Music Group (International); 300 Elektra Entertainment (United States)
- Country of origin: France
- Location: Paris
- Official website: elektrafrance.com

Elektra France is a French record label used as copyright-holder for France releases on the Elektra label. It was founded in February 2016 by Fally Ipupa

By 2023, their artists included Moha La Squale, Fally Ipupa, BB Brunes, Ofenbach and 13 Block. Current and older releases are listed on Discogs.

On October 31, 2024, 300 Elektra Entertainment merged with Atlantic Records, though still retaining imprints on releases.
