= Bois Lie =

2022 promotional single by Avril Lavigne featuring Machine Gun Kelly

- Acoustic version cover

Promotional single by Avril Lavigne featuring Machine Gun Kelly

from the album Love Sux
- Released: August 26, 2022
- Genre: Pop-punk
- Length: 2:43
- Label: DTA; Elektra
- Songwriter(s): Avril Lavigne; Colson Baker; Derek "Mod Sun" Smith; John Feldmann
- Producer(s): John Feldmann; Travis Barker; Mod Sun

Music video
- "Bois Lie" (Live Video) on YouTube

"Bois Lie" is a song by Canadian singer Avril Lavigne featuring American musician Machine Gun Kelly. It is the second track on Lavigne's seventh studio album Love Sux. The song was released as a promotional single on August 26, 2022, along with an official music video. Upon the release of Love Sux, the song peaked at number 85 on the Canadian Hot 100.

== Background ==
Avril Lavigne announced her seventh studio album Love Sux on January 13, 2022, with "Bois Lie" confirmed as the second track.

== Reception ==
Gigwise called it an earworm. Kerrang! called it excellent. musicOMH called Kelly's vocals engaging. Wall of Sound called it a super infectious, top tier pop punk song. Conversely, AllMusic felt that the song fell flat and that the collaboration with Kelly was unnecessary. The Line of Best Fit felt that the song would be less distasteful, if it wasn't for the collaboration with Kelly.

== Music video ==
The official music video for "Bois Lie" was directed by Nathan James. It consists of live footage of Avril Lavigne and Machine Gun Kelly performing the song live on the latter's Mainstream Sellout Tour, combined with backstage and studio scenes. It premiered on August 26, 2022.

== Track listings ==
Digital download

1. "Bois Lie" (acoustic; featuring Machine Gun Kelly) – 2:50

Streaming

1. "Bois Lie" (acoustic; featuring Machine Gun Kelly) – 2:50
2. "Bois Lie" (featuring Machine Gun Kelly) – 2:43

== Charts ==
Chart performance for "Bois Lie"
Chart (2022)	Peak position
Canada (Canadian Hot 100)	85
New Zealand Hot Singles (RMNZ)	15
US Hot Rock & Alternative Songs (Billboard)	22
