= Love It When You Hate Me =

2022 single by Avril Lavigne featuring Blackbear

Single by Avril Lavigne featuring Blackbear

from the album Love Sux
- B-side: "Bite Me"
- Released: January 14, 2022
- Genre: Pop-punk; rap rock
- Length: 2:25
- Label: DTA; Elektra
- Songwriters: Avril Lavigne; John Feldmann; Derek "Mod Sun" Smith; Matthew Musto
- Producers: John Feldmann; Travis Barker; Mod Sun

Avril Lavigne singles chronology
"Bite Me" (2021)	"Love It When You Hate Me" (2022)	"I'm a Mess" (2022)

Blackbear singles chronology
"@ My Worst" (2021)	"Love It When You Hate Me" (2022)	"IDGAF" (2022)

Music video
- "Love It When You Hate Me" on YouTube

"Love It When You Hate Me" is a song by Canadian singer Avril Lavigne featuring American singer Blackbear. It was released on January 14, 2022, through Elektra Records as the second single from Lavigne's seventh studio album, Love Sux (2022).

== Background ==
"Love It When You Hate Me" was released the same day as Lavigne announced the title, release date and track list of Love Sux.

== Promotion ==
In the United States, "Love It When You Hate Me" was sent to contemporary hit radio on January 25, 2022 and to adult contemporary radio on February 7, 2022. It was also sent to Italian radio.

== Critical reception ==
Ali Shutner from NME described "Love It When You Hate Me" as a "pop-punk banger", and Emily Carter writing for Kerrang! noted that the song "hears the Canadian star embracing nostalgic pop-punk in the chorus – 'The highs the lows the yes, the nos / You're so hot when you get cold / Don't call me baby / I love it when you hate me' – and fresher elements in the verses."

== Accolades ==
Award	Year	Category	Result	Ref.
MTV Video Music Awards	2022	Best Alternative	Nominated	

== Commercial performance ==
"Love It When You Hate Me" debuted at number 76 on Canadian Hot 100. In the United States, the song debuted at number 15 on the Billboard Hot Rock & Alternative Songs. It peaked at number 25 on the Mainstream Top 40 chart, and number 18 on the US Adult Top 40 chart, It was Lavigne's biggest hit on the chart since her 2011 single "What the Hell".

== Music video ==
The official music video for "Love It When You Hate Me" was directed by Audrey Ellis Fox and was released on March 5, 2022. It opens up with Avril being chased by paparazzi after a prison sentence due to "falling in love too many times". The video mainly shows Lavigne, Blackbear and Barker performing inside of a prison cell with dancing female inmates. The ending showed Lavigne flipping off the press following her release for bad behavior. The music video was nominated for 2022 MTV Video Music Awards' Best Alternative music video, it was Lavigne's first Video Music Award nomination since her 2007 single "Girlfriend".

== Track listing ==
- Digital download
1. "Love It When You Hate Me" (featuring Blackbear) – 2:25
- Streaming (explicit)
1. "Love It When You Hate Me" (featuring Blackbear) – 2:25
2. "Bite Me" – 2:39
3. "Bite Me" (acoustic) – 3:09
- Streaming (clean)
1. "Love It When You Hate Me" (featuring Blackbear) – 2:25
2. "Bite Me" – 2:39

== Credits and personnel ==
Credits and personnel are adapted from the Love Sux album liner notes.

- Avril Lavigne – vocals, writer
- John Feldmann – writer, producer, guitar, bass
- Derek "Mod Sun" Smith – writer, producer
- Matthew Musto – writer, vocals
- Travis Barker – producer, drums
- Manny Marroquin – mixing
- Dylan McLean – additional production and engineering, additional guitar and bass
- Scot Stewart – additional production and engineering, additional guitar and bass
- Michael Bono – additional production and engineering, additional guitar and bass
- Josh Thornberry – additional production and engineering
- Cameron Mizell – additional production and engineering
- Hero DeLano – additional production and engineering
- Kevin Thrash – additional engineering
- Andrew Goldstein – additional engineering
- Chris Gehringer – mastering

== Charts ==
=== Weekly charts ===
Weekly chart performance for "Love It When You Hate Me"
Chart (2022)	Peak position
Australia Digital Tracks (ARIA)	37
Canada Hot 100 (Billboard)	76
Canada CHR/Top 40 (Billboard)	40
Canada Hot AC (Billboard)	41
New Zealand Hot Singles (RMNZ)	9
UK Singles Downloads (OCC)	40
UK Singles Sales (OCC)	40
US Adult Pop Airplay (Billboard)	18
US Hot Rock & Alternative Songs (Billboard)	15
US Pop Airplay (Billboard)	25

=== Year-end charts ===
Year-end chart performance for "Love It When You Hate Me"
Chart (2022)	Position
US Hot Rock & Alternative Songs (Billboard)	52

== Release history ==
Release dates and formats for "Love It When You Hate Me"
Region	Date	Format(s)	Label(s)	Ref.
Various	January 14, 2022	Digital download; streaming	DTA; Elektra	
Italy	January 14, 2022	Radio airplay	Warner	
United States	January 25, 2022	Contemporary hit radio	DTA; Elektra	
United States	February 7, 2022	Adult contemporary radio; hot adult contemporary radio; modern adult contemporary radio	DTA; Elektra	
