= Bite Me (Avril Lavigne song) =

2021 single by Avril Lavigne

Single by Avril Lavigne

from the album Love Sux
- Released: November 10, 2021
- Genre: Pop-punk; emo pop
- Length: 2:39
- Label: DTA; Elektra
- Songwriters: Avril Lavigne; John Feldmann; Derek "Mod Sun" Smith; Omer Fedi; Marshmello
- Producers: John Feldmann; Mod Sun; Travis Barker

Avril Lavigne singles chronology
"Flames" (2021)	"Bite Me" (2021)	"Love It When You Hate Me" (2022)

Music videos
- "Bite Me" on YouTube; "Bite Me" (Acoustic version) on YouTube

"Bite Me" is a song by Canadian singer Avril Lavigne. It was released on November 10, 2021, through Elektra Records and as Lavigne's debut on Travis Barker's label DTA Records. It is the lead single from Lavigne's seventh studio album, Love Sux (2022). The song was noted by critics as a return to Lavigne's pop-punk roots. The song peaked at number 63 on the Canadian Hot 100 and number 61 on the UK Singles Chart.

In the United States, “Bite Me” reached number 13 on Billboard’s Hot Rock & Alternative Songs chart, the main chart for the rock and alternative genre. It also ranked at number 41 on the chart’s year-end list, despite being released in late November. The song received generally positive critical reception and was included on several year-end critics’ lists, cementing its status as a well-regarded, genre-focused release for Lavigne within the contemporary pop-punk and alternative landscape.

== Background and release ==
Canadian pop punk artist Avril Lavigne released her sixth studio album, Head Above Water, on February 15, 2019, through BMG. The album was inspired by the two years during which Lavigne suffered from Lyme disease, which left her mostly bedridden and unable to perform. That September, Lavigne embarked on a North American tour in support of Head Above Water, her first such tour in five years. A European tour, originally set to begin in early 2020, had to be rescheduled for 2022 due to the COVID-19 pandemic.

While quarantined at home during the pandemic, Lavigne told American Songwriter that she had begun working on new music, which she hoped to release sometime in 2021. That December, Lavigne posted a photo on Instagram of her in a recording studio with Mod Sun and Machine Gun Kelly, leading to speculation that the trio was working on music together. "Flames", a Mod Sun song featuring Lavigne, was released on January 8, 2021. The following month, Lavigne confirmed on Instagram that she had finished working on her new album, and that she would release new music that summer. Producer John Feldmann, known for his work with bands such as Blink-182, All Time Low, and Goldfinger, meanwhile, confirmed to Wall of Sound that he had been working with Lavigne and that her new album would bring "back her pop punk roots".

== Writing and composition ==
"Bite Me" is a pop punk and emo pop song that has drawn comparisons to Lavigne's earlier studio albums Let Go (2002) and The Best Damn Thing (2007), as well as to the band Paramore. The song is written in the key of E-flat major, with a tempo of 170 beats per minute. Lyrically, Lavigne describes "Bite Me" as "an anthem about knowing your worth, what you deserve, and not giving someone a second chance who doesn't deserve you". Lavigne also described the track as a "super sassy" response to a romantic partner who realizes they made a mistake, only to be rejected when they attempt to reconcile.

The song was noted by several publications to mark Lavigne's return to the pop punk genre; with NME referring to it as a "pop-punk takedown of an ex", and Billboard describing it as a "guitar- and drum-heavy track" which "features Lavigne raging at her former lover for failing to treat her properly, promising that they'll always regret being kicked out of her life."

== Release and promotion ==
"I am excited to be dropping 'Bite Me'. It's an anthem about knowing your worth, what you deserve, and not giving someone a second chance who doesn't deserve you."

— Lavigne on releasing "Bite Me" as a single

"Bite Me" was announced on November 5, 2021, when Lavigne posted the pre-save link together with the single's cover on Instagram and Twitter. On November 6, Lavigne posted a rehearsal video of her and Travis Barker with an audio snippet of the song on her social media.

In the United States, "Bite Me" was sent to alternative radio on November 16, 2021.

== Critical reception ==
"Bite Me" received critical acclaim upon its release, with George Griffiths of Official Charts Company describing it as a "confident return to form for pop punk's reigning motherf**king princess" remarking that "it's a lovely surprise to hear just how fresh Avril sounds. Her voice is crisp and clear on the song's chorus; like she hasn't aged a day since she first dropped 'Complicated'." Writing for The A.V. Club, Tatiana Tenreyro opined that the song is "the closest to the Lavigne her early fans fell in love with at the beginning of her career. Not only is it a big return to pop punk, but it also sounds delightfully nostalgic." Reviewing for Gay Times, Conor Clark compared "Bite Me" to Lavigne's third studio album The Best Damn Thing (2007), and remarked that "Avril's fierce new song is a reminder of why she is and always will be the Queen of Pop Punk."

=== Year-end lists ===
Publication	Rank	Ref.
Billboard	68	
Exclaim!	7	
Glamour	—N/a	
Loudwire	21	
Marie Claire	—N/a	
PopBuzz	49	
Spin	13	
The Tab	36	

== Accolades ==
Award	Year	Category	Result	Ref.
Juno Awards	2023	Single of the Year	Nominated	

== Commercial performance ==
Worldwide "Bite Me" debuted at number 133 on the Billboard Global 200 chart - it was Lavigne's first song to enter the chart.

In Canada, "Bite Me" debuted at number 63 on the Canadian Hot 100 chart, it was certified Gold in Canada with 40,000 units sold. "Bite Me" was Lavigne's first lead single to not enter the US Billboard Hot 100, but it peaked at number 20 on the Billboard Bubbling Under Hot 100 chart. and peaked at number 13 on the US Hot Rock & Alternative Songs chart. In the United Kingdom, "Bite Me" debuted at number 61 on the UK Singles Chart. "Bite Me" was certified Gold in Brazil with 20,000 units sold.

== Music videos ==
The Hannah Lux Davis-directed music video was released on November 12, 2021. The music video sees Lavigne and Barker, with some help from their rowdy gang of tutu-wearing and axe-wielding friends, terrorizing the man that caused Lavigne heartbreak. The group crashes the man’s loft after breaking the lock, to trash the apartment space, torture the unsuspecting man and play loud music at full blast.

The video for the acoustic version, directed by Mod Sun and Charlie Zwick, was released on December 17, 2021 and it featured John Feldmann and his wife Amy as doctor and nurse respectively. In it, Lavigne arrives at the dentist office and enters the room, while the doctor takes a break, to pull out all the patient's teeth which are then used to make a necklace.

== Live performances ==
Lavigne performed "Bite Me" for the first time on The Late Late Show with James Corden on November 10, 2021, with drummer Travis Barker of Blink-182. Lavigne also did an interview with Corden about her new single "Bite Me", her upcoming seventh studio album, and her upcoming 2022 concert tour. On November 23, 2021, she performed the single on The Tonight Show Starring Jimmy Fallon. On November 30, 2021, Lavigne performed the single on The Ellen DeGeneres Show with drummer Travis Barker, it was her first appearance on the show since 2007. On December 31, 2021 Lavigne performed the single on Dick Clark's New Year's Rockin' Eve party as the last performance of that year. On January 16, 2022 Lavigne performed Bite Me during her surprise set at IHeart Alter Ego festival, along with her smash hits Girlfriend, My Happy Ending and Sk8er Boi. Lavigne also performed the single on Japanese TV show Music Station on February 11, 2022.

== Credits and personnel ==
Credits and personnel are adapted from the Love Sux album liner notes.

- Avril Lavigne – vocals
- John Feldmann – guitar, bass, production
- Derek "Mod Sun" Smith – production
- Travis Barker – drums, production
- Dylan McLean – additional guitar and bass, additional production and engineering
- Scot Stewart – additional guitar and bass, additional production and engineering
- Michael Bono – additional guitar and bass, additional production and engineering
- Josh Thornberry – additional production and engineering
- Cameron Mizell – additional production and engineering
- Hero DeLano – additional production and engineering
- Kevin Thrash – additional engineering
- Chris Gehringer – mastering
- Adam Hawkins – mixing

== Charts ==
=== Weekly charts ===
Weekly chart performance for "Bite Me"
Chart (2021–22)	Peak position
Australia Digital Tracks (ARIA)	20
Canada Hot 100 (Billboard)	63
Canada CHR/Top 40 (Billboard)	46
Canada Hot AC (Billboard)	46
Czech Republic Airplay (ČNS IFPI)	25
Global 200 (Billboard)	133
Hungary (Single Top 40)	25
Ireland (IRMA)	87
Japan Download Songs (Billboard)	56
Japan Hot Overseas (Billboard)	18
New Zealand Hot Singles (RMNZ)	19
UK Singles (Official Charts)	61
US Bubbling Under Hot 100 (Billboard)	20
US Digital Song Sales (Billboard)	22
US Hot Rock & Alternative Songs (Billboard)	13
US Alternative Airplay (Billboard)	23

=== Year-end charts ===
Year-end chart performance for "Bite Me"
Chart (2022)	Position
US Hot Rock & Alternative Songs (Billboard)	41

== Certifications ==
Certifications for "Bite Me"
Region	Certification	Certified units/sales
Brazil (Pro-Música Brasil)	Gold	20,000^{‡}
Canada (Music Canada)	Platinum	80,000^{‡}
^{‡} Sales+streaming figures based on certification alone.

== Release history ==
Release history for "Bite Me"
Country	Date	Format(s)	Version	Label(s)	Ref.
Various	November 10, 2021	Digital download; streaming	Original	DTA; Elektra	
United States	November 16, 2021	Alternative radio	Original	DTA; Elektra	
Italy	November 26, 2021	Radio airplay	Original	Warner	
Various	December 17, 2021	Digital download; streaming	Acoustic	DTA; Elektra	
