= Elektra Records =

American record label

- Parent company: Warner Music Group
- Founded: February 6, 1950; 76 years ago
- Founder: Jac Holzman; Paul Rickolt
- Distributors: Atlantic Music Group; (United States); Elektra France (France); Parlophone (UK); Warner Music Group; (International); Rhino Entertainment Company; (Re-issues)
- Genre: Various
- Country of origin: United States
- Official website: elektra.com

Elektra Records (or Elektra Entertainment) is an American record label owned by Warner Music Group, founded in 1950 by Jac Holzman and Paul Rickolt. It played an important role in the development of contemporary folk and rock music between the 1950s and 1970s. In 2004, it was consolidated into WMG's Atlantic Records Group. After five years of dormancy, the label was revived as an imprint of Atlantic in 2009. In October 2018, Elektra was detached from the Atlantic Records umbrella and reorganized into Elektra Music Group, once again operating as an independently managed frontline label of Warner Music. In June 2022, Elektra Music Group was merged with 300 Entertainment to create the umbrella label 300 Elektra Entertainment (3EE), though both Elektra and 300 continued to maintain their separate identities as labels. In October 2024, 300 Elektra Entertainment merged with Atlantic Music Group, though still retaining imprints on releases.

== History ==
=== 1950–1971: Founding and early history ===
Elektra was formed in 1950, as the Elektra-Stratford Record Corporation, with a singles label called Stratford Records, by Jac Holzman and Paul Rickolt in Holzman's St. John's College dorm room. Each invested $300. The usual spelling of the Indoeuropean mythological Electra was changed. Holzman famously explained, "I gave her the 'K' that I lacked". He found the 'C' in the original name "too soft", but liked the "solid bite" of the letter 'K', citing its use in the Kodak name.

The first Elektra LP, New Songs (EKLP 1 released March 1951), was a collection of Lieder and similar art songs, which sold few copies. During the 1950s and early 1960s, the label concentrated on folk music recordings, releasing a number of best-selling albums by Theodore Bikel, Ed McCurdy, Oscar Brand, and Judy Collins, and protest singers such as Phil Ochs and Tom Paxton. Holzman also recorded Josh White, who was without a record deal as a result of McCarthyite blacklisting.

"E" logo used from 1966–1983 and from 2009–2022.

In 1964, Elektra launched Nonesuch Records. This classical budget label was the best-selling budget classical label of the era. Other labels followed suit by starting their own budget series, but Nonesuch remained the most popular and Jac Holzman states in his book that profits from the budget classical label made it possible for Elektra to experiment with their pop releases by the mid-1960s.

In 1965, Elektra began a short-lived joint venture with Survey Music called Bounty Records, which was Elektra's first foray into pop music. The most notable signing for Bounty was the Paul Butterfield Band who was moved over to Elektra when Bounty folded.

Elektra's entrance into pop gained the label considerable prestige within the music scene by being one of the first labels to sign up leading acts from the new wave of American psychedelic rock of 1966–1967. The label's most important signings were the Chicago-based Paul Butterfield Blues Band (with Mike Bloomfield), the Los Angeles bands Love and The Doors, and the Detroit bands The Stooges and MC5. Included in Elektra's Los Angeles-based signings were Tim Buckley and Bread. In 1968, the label also signed pioneering rock guitar soloist Lonnie Mack to a three-album deal.

Also in 1967, Elektra launched its Nonesuch Explorer Series, one of the first collections of what is now referred to as world music. Excerpts from several Nonesuch Explorer recordings were later included on the two Voyager Golden Discs, which were sent into deep space in 1977 aboard the Voyager 1 and Voyager 2 space probes.

=== 1971–1989: Elektra/Asylum Records ===
Elektra, along with its Nonesuch Records subsidiary, was acquired by Kinney National Services in 1970, which changed its name to Warner Communications (now Warner Bros. Discovery) in 1972. Soon afterwards, Kinney consolidated their label holdings under the Warner-Elektra-Atlantic umbrella. Holzman remained in charge of Elektra until 1972, when it merged with Asylum Records to become Elektra/Asylum Records; Asylum's founder, David Geffen, headed the newly combined label. Holzman, in the meantime, was appointed senior vice president and chief technologist for Warner — ushering the company into home video and the first interactive cable system. Holzman also went on to acquire Discovery Records. In 1975, Geffen stepped down when he was told that he had a terminal illness; He later was revealed to have been falsely diagnosed. He was replaced by Joe Smith, who later went on to become CEO of Capitol Records.

Joe Smith, whose leadership resulted in the biggest market share and gross revenues Elektra Asylum was to have, inherited the A&R services of Chuck Plotkin, famed later for producing many of Bruce Springsteen's greatest records, followed up by George Daly, who is credited as bringing in seminal new wave band The Cars, setting Elektra, again, on another artist direction.

Although the label was technically listed as "Elektra/Asylum Records" on the label credits, as the years went on, the label began to unofficially call itself Elektra Records again (with Asylum operating as a subsidiary label). In 1982, Elektra launched a jazz subsidiary called Elektra/Musician. The following year, Bob Krasnow became president and CEO of Elektra; under his leadership, the label reached its commercial peak throughout the rest of the 1980s and early to mid-1990s.

=== 1989–2004: Elektra Entertainment Group ===
In 1989, the label officially changed its name to Elektra Entertainment. During the Bob Krasnow era, the label became home to a wide range of artists, such as Metallica, Yngwie Malmsteen, Faster Pussycat, Mötley Crüe, Phish, Tracy Chapman, 10,000 Maniacs, They Might Be Giants, The Cure, The Sugarcubes, Stereolab, Luna, The Call, X, The Afghan Whigs, Anita Baker, Linda Ronstadt, Natalie Cole, Brand Nubian, KMD, Pete Rock & CL Smooth, and Ween. The label's A&R department included former music journalist Terry Tolkin, who was credited with coining the term "alternative music" in the late 1970s. Also during this time, Elektra developed a relationship with the UK label 4AD. Elektra became the label for 4AD acts such as the Pixies, the Breeders, Frank Black, and The Amps in the United States.

Like its sister labels, Elektra's fortunes began to wane in the mid-1990s, in part because of a series of bitter corporate battles between senior Warner label executives, which seriously damaged the collective reputation of the group. Unhappy with major structural changes enacted by then Warner Music Group chairman Robert Morgado, Bob Krasnow abruptly resigned in July 1994, and others soon followed; the highly respected Warner Bros CEO Mo Ostin decided not to renew his contract and left in December 1994, and Ostin's friend and protégé Lenny Waronker left early the next year. Krasnow was replaced by Sylvia Rhone, who at the time was a senior vice president at Atlantic Records, and also the CEO of Atlantic's EastWest Records America imprint. Upon Rhone's arrival at Elektra, the label took over the operations of EastWest, as well as Sire Records (which had previously operated through its sister label Warner Bros. Records) and was renamed Elektra Entertainment Group.

In September 1994, another damaging controversy erupted when heavy metal band Metallica filed suit against Elektra to terminate their contract and gain ownership of their master recordings. The group based its claim on a section of the California Labor Code, that allows employees to be released from a personal services contract after seven years. By this time, Metallica had been with the label for more than a decade and had racked up sales over 40 million records, but they were still operating under the terms of their original 1984 contract, which provided a relatively low 14% royalty rate. The group also claimed that they were taking the action because Robert Morgado had refused to honor a new deal they had worked out with Bob Krasnow shortly before he quit the label. Elektra responded by countersuing the group, but in December, New York magazine reported rumors that then Warner Music US chairman Doug Morris had offered the group a lucrative new deal in exchange for dropping the suit, which was reported to be even more generous than the earlier Krasnow deal. In January, the group and Elektra jointly announced that they had settled the suit, and although a nondisclosure agreement kept the terms secret, media sources claimed, "a significant increase in royalty payments to the band as well as a renegotiation of the group's recording contract were key factors in Metallica and Elektra coming to terms."

Despite having a large stable of noted acts, as the 1990s drew to a close, Elektra began to see a slump in revenue, while noticeably underperforming on the charts. It also developed a bit of a sullen reputation in the industry for not properly promoting many of its releases, thus earning the nickname "Neglektra" from several signed artists, such as Marvelous 3, Jason Falkner, and Greg Dulli, and was easily lagging behind its sister labels Warner Bros. Records and Atlantic Records.

=== 2004–2018: Atlantic era ===
In February 2004, Warner Music Group was sold by Time Warner to a group of private investors made up of Thomas Lee Partners, Bain & Company, and Edgar Bronfman Jr. (who assumed CEO duties).

The new owners of WMG decided to merge Elektra and Atlantic Records. Because it was the lesser performing label of the two, 40% of Elektra's operations were put into the new venture, while a commanding 60% of Atlantic's went in. Subsequently, the new company was called Atlantic Records Group, with Elektra breaking off into a subsidiary that became dormant until the label was revived in 2009 (though longtime time Elektra artists such as Tracy Chapman, Björk, and Yolanda Adams continued to have releases on the label, while newer signees such as Jason Mraz and Jet were transferred to Atlantic).

Atlantic Records Group announced the revival of Elektra Records as an independent entity within Warner Music on June 1, 2009. The revived label is headed up by two new co-Presidents: Mike Caren, Exec. VP of A&R for Atlantic Records, and John Janick, founder and President of prominent indie label Fueled by Ramen. The revived label uses a modified version of the circa-1970s Elektra logo.

The first release of the new label was the original soundtrack of the HBO show True Blood, and the first album released was Charlotte Gainsbourg's IRM. The label is now home to artists such as Uffie, Little Boots, Justice, Bruno Mars, and CeeLo Green.

On October 4, 2012, Warner Music announced that Jeff Castelaz, the co-founder of Los Angeles-based independent label Dangerbird Records, had been named president of Elektra Records. Gregg Nadel from Atlantic Records A&R became General Manager of the label in 2015. In September 2015, Castelaz stepped down from his role at Elektra, leaving Nadel to run the label.

In 2016, Elektra's releases included A/B, the debut album by Icelandic rock band Kaleo, which included the number-one Alternative hit "Way Down We Go", Fitz and the Tantrums' self-titled third album and the critically acclaimed Southern Family, which garnered a 2016 CMA Nomination for "Musical Event of the Year". Nadel was officially named president of the label in 2017. In October 2017, Elektra Records partnered with MSG Networks for "Friday Night Knicks".

=== 2018–2022: Elektra Music Group ===
Announced on June 18, 2018, Warner Music Group relaunched Elektra Music Group on October 1, as a stand-alone, staffed music company with the labels Black Cement, Elektra, Fueled by Ramen (FBR), Low Country Sound, and Roadrunner Records. A handful of major artists transferred from Atlantic. This returned the group to the Warner-Elektra-Atlantic triad that had for decades marked the original company organization. Staff from Elektra, FBR, and Roadrunner labels, plus some from Atlantic, staffed the new standalone group with co-presidents Mike Easterlin and Gregg Nadel coming from Fueled by Ramen and Roadrunner Records and Elektra, respectively, where they served as label presidents. Elektra co-presidents answered, though, to Atlantic Records Group Chairman and CEO Craig Kallman and Chairwoman and COO Julie Greenwald.

On October 3, 2018, Elektra revealed its entire leadership team. The label group's first release was Trench by Twenty One Pilots on October 5, 2018, on Fueled by Ramen label. Despite that, Atlantic Records is still mentioned in liner notes of the album. In 2019, the label had huge success again with Tones and I's hit single "Dance Monkey". In December 2019, Elektra became the distributor for DTA Records, set up by Travis Barker.

=== 2022–2024: 300 Elektra Entertainment ===
On June 22, 2022, Warner Music Group announced the creation of 300 Elektra Entertainment (3EE), a new umbrella group created from the merger of Elektra Music Group and 300 Entertainment. The umbrella group means that Fueled by Ramen, Low Country Sound and Roadrunner have been placed into a singular unit with 300 Entertainment's labels. Despite this merger, WMG maintained that 300 and Elektra will keep their separate identities.

In October 2024, 300 Elektra Entertainment merged with Atlantic Records, though still retaining imprints on releases.

== See also ==
- Elektra Sound Recorders
