= I Do (Jessie James Decker song) =

Single by Jessie James Decker
- Released: October 31, 2013
- Genre: Country
- Length: 3:51
- Label: Jessie James Decker
- Songwriter: Jessie James Decker

Jessie James Decker singles chronology
"Military Man" (2012)	"I Do" (2013)	"Clint Eastwood" (2015)

Music video
- "I Do" on YouTube

"I Do" is a song written and recorded by American country singer and reality television personality Jessie James Decker. Inspired by her relationship, the song, which describes a deep love, was written by Decker as a wedding gift for her husband Eric Decker. It was released independently as a single on October 31, 2013. "I Do" is the first song released under Decker's married name, having previously been credited as Jessie James.

The song was featured in the season one finale of their E! reality series, Eric & Jessie: Game On, which aired on November 3, 2013 and focused on the Deckers' June 2013 wedding ceremony. An accompanying music video was officially released on November 6, 2016. "I Do" spent one week on the Billboard Hot Country Songs chart at number 39 following the airing of the show.

== Critical reception ==
Dave Herrera of Westword wrote that the song is "an earnest ballad that meets at a crossroads of Shania Twain and Celine Dion." Reviewing a live performance of the song, The Boston Theatre called the song a "softer more angelic" track on which Decker's "vocals are a force to be reckoned with."

== Commercial performance ==
"I Do" debuted at number 30 on the Billboard Country Digital Songs chart, selling 16,000 copies in its first week. Driven primarily by sales, the song debuted at number 39 on the Hot Country Songs chart dated November 23, 2013. This position earned Decker her highest-charting country single until 2015, when "Lights Down Low" reached 38.

== Music video ==
An accompanying music video was made available online on November 6, 2013 following the finale of the first season of Eric & Jessie: Game On. Including footage of the couple's wedding day, the video "showcases some of the most special moments" from the event, while also featuring scenes of Decker in studio recording the song. The video was uploaded to Decker's official YouTube channel on November 8, 2013.

== Live performances ==
Decker included "I Do" on the setlist for her 2016 Lights Down Low Tour, bringing her husband on stage with her for the song at the show in Nashville, Tennessee.

== Charts ==
Chart (2013)	Peak position
US Hot Country Songs (Billboard)	39
