= Alyssa Bonagura =

American singer-songwriter

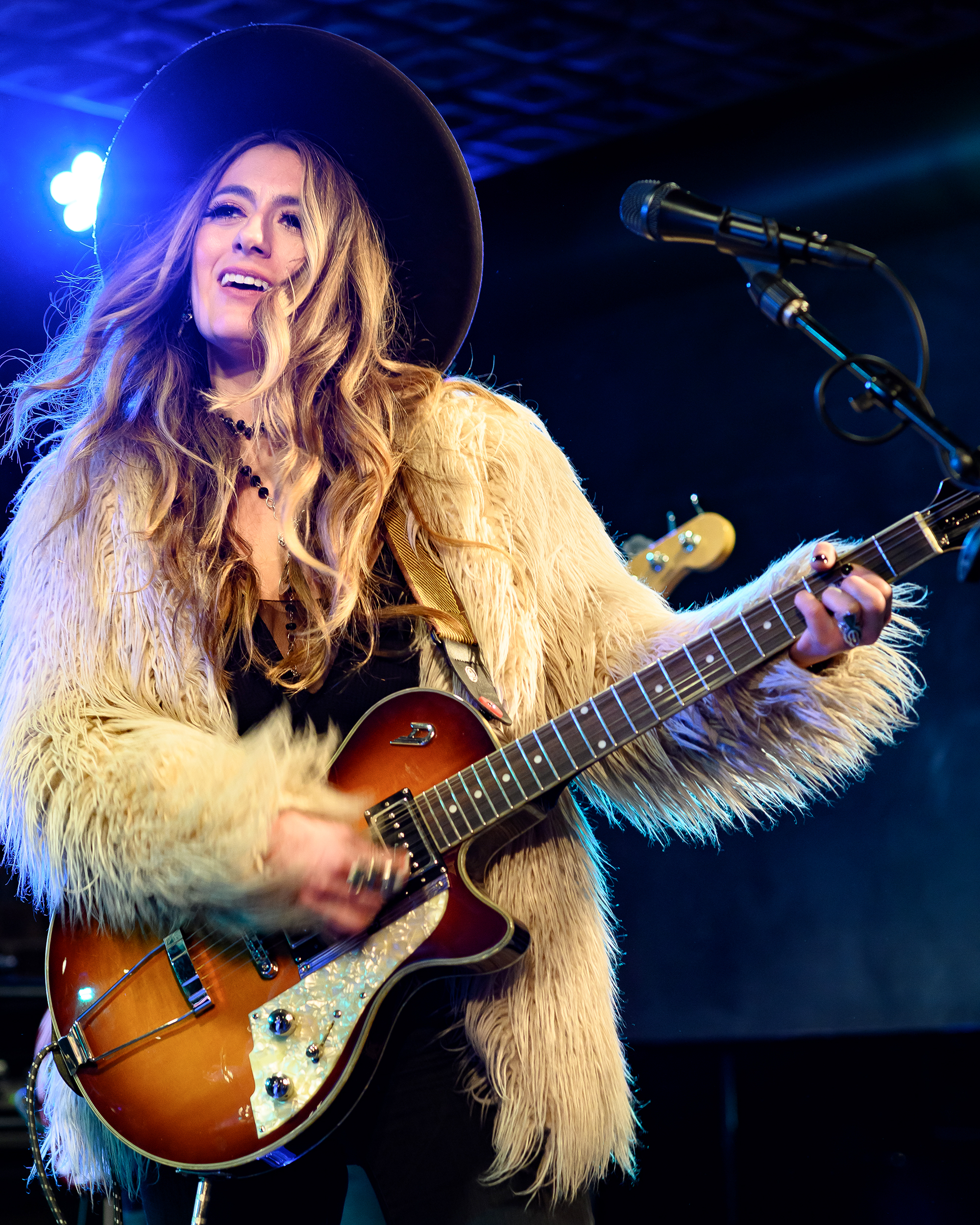
- Bonagura in 2019 with The Sisterhood

Background information
- Born: April 1, 1988 (age 38); Franklin, Tennessee, U.S.
- Genres: Country, pop
- Occupations: Singer-songwriter, musician, producer
- Instruments: Vocals, guitar
- Years active: 1998–present
- Website: alyssabonagura.com

Alyssa Bonagura (born April 1, 1988) is an American singer-songwriter.

== Early life and career ==
Alyssa Bonagura is from Franklin, Tennessee. She is the daughter of singers Michael Bonagura and Kathie Baillie of Baillie & the Boys. She has been singing since the age of 2 and is a multi-instrumentalist. At the age of 10, she was asked by Kenny Rogers to sing a duet with him on his Christmas album Christmas From The Heart. She was awarded the Sennheiser Scholarship which allowed her to graduate from Liverpool Institute for Performing Arts with a degree in sound technology in 2009. She performed back up vocals in "That Old Glass Case" on her mother's 2006 album Love's Funny That Way. While studying in England from 2006 to 2009, she became a temporary member of Pete Wylie and The Mighty Wah! and played at such events as the 2007 Queens Variety Show in Liverpool, England at the Empire Theatre, and Knowsley Hall Music Festival alongside acts such as The Who, The Coral, and The Thrills. She performed at the 2008 European Capital of Culture event, Liverpool: the Musical – the event which inaugurated Liverpool's new Echo Arena with Ringo Starr.

In 2010, Bonagura signed with Rondor Music International (A division of Universal Music) as a songwriter and has successfully written songs for Raquel Castro's debut single "Diary". In 2011, Sarah Jarosz released a single that she co-wrote with Bonagura called "Run Away." She's also co-written the song "Keeping Secrets" with Tyler Ward on his 2012 album Hello. Love. Heartbreak. and "Like U" for Kaya Jones.

She has produced artists including Jo Dee Messina and Jessie James Decker. Bonagura co-wrote, produced, and was featured on the song "Unbreakable", the first song Messina has released since her split from a major label. Jessie James' version of Bonagura's song "Nothing More To Say" was featured on Perez Hilton's blog site in 2010.

In 2012, her song "I Make My Own Sunshine" was used in a Lowe's commercial. Her debut album Love Hard was released on October 30, 2012.

Penned by Bonagura, her father Michael, and Matthew and Gunnar Nelson, the single, "This Christmas", is the title-track of Nelson's album and marks their first return on a Billboard chart in more than 20 years. "This Christmas" debuted at #22 on the Adult Contemporary chart on December 12, 2015.

On March 13, 2016, Bonagura performed with bandmate Ruby Stewart at the CMC Rocks festival in Queensland, Australia. Billing themselves as The Sisterhood, the two had been working together for a year after Rod Stewart told them, "you two should start a band, your voices are good together." The two performed a one-hour set with backing by the Morgan Evans band.

== Discography ==
=== Albums ===
- 2008 Before the Breaking (EP)
- 2010 The English Diaries
- 2012 Love Hard
- 2016 Road Less Traveled

=== Singles ===
- 2011 "Killing Me" (feat. Tyler Wilkinson)
- 2012 "I Make My Own Sunshine"
- 2012 "Nothing More to Say"
- 2021 "New Wings"
- 2022 "Other Side of the World"

=== Music videos ===
Year	Title	Director
2016	"Rebel"	Dallas Wilson

=== As a writer and producer ===
Year	Artist	Album	Song
2021	Jessie James Decker	The Woman I've Become (EP)	"I Need A Man"
2019	The Sisterhood	N/A	"Get Up and Go"
2019	The Sisterhood	N/A	"Bullet"
2019	Jessie James Decker	N/A	"Roots And Wings"
2017	Jessie James Decker	Southern Girl City Lights (Epic)	"Another Dumb Love Song"
2017	Jessie James Decker	Southern Girl City Lights (Epic)	"Girl Like Me"
2017	Jessie James Decker	Southern Girl City Lights (Epic)	"Flip My Hair"
2017	Gold (Epic)	"Gold"	
2016	Steven Tyler	We're All Somebody from Somewhere (Dot Records)	"I Make My Own Sunshine"
2015	Jana Kramer	Thirty One (Warner Bros. Records)	"Circles"
2015	Jessie James Decker	N/A	"Lights Down Low"
2014	Jessie James Decker	Comin' Home (19 Recordings)	"Rain on the Roof of This Car"
2014	Jessie James Decker	Comin' Home (19 Recordings)	"Diary"
2014	Jessie James Decker	Comin' Home (19 Recordings)	"Momma Wrote You A Lullaby"
2014	Jo Dee Messina	Me (Dreambound)	"Not Dead Yet"
2014	Jo Dee Messina	Me (Dreambound)	"He's Messed Up"
2014	Tyler Hilton	Indian Summer (Hooptie Tune Records)	"I Want To Be in Love So Bad"
2014	Morgan Evans	Morgan Evans (Warner Music Australasia)	"Tornado"
2014	Morgan Evans	Morgan Evans (Warner Music Australasia)	"I Wanna Go"
2014	Morgan Evans	Morgan Evans (Warner Music Australasia)	"Best of Me"
2014	Morgan Evans	Morgan Evans (Warner Music Australasia)	"Best I Never Had"
2013	Tyler Ward	Hello. Love. Heartbreak. (Sony Music Entertainment)	"Keeping Secrets"
2013	Jo Dee Messina	N/A	"Unbreakable" (Note: iTunes single)
2013	Sarah Jarosz	Build Me Up From Bones (Sugar Hill Records)	"Gone Too Soon"
2012	Chelsea Basham	N/A	"I Make My Own Sunshine"
2011	Sarah Jarosz	Follow Me Down (Sugar Hill Records)	"Run Away"
2011	Isabelle Boulay	Les grands espaces (Disques Chic Musique)	"All I Want Is Love"
2011	Jessie James Decker	N/A	"Nothing More To Say" (Note: Unreleased single (featured on Perez Hilton's website))
