= Decker the Halls =

EP by Jessie James Decker
- Released: 2 November 2023
- Recorded: 2023
- Genre: Christmas music
- Length: 18:00
- Label: Warner Nashville

Jessie James Decker chronology
The Woman I've Become (2021)	Decker the Halls (2023)

Decker the Halls is the ninth release overall and sixth extended play by American country music singer Jessie James Decker and is her second Christmas EP, following her first full-length Christmas album On This Holiday (2018) and her EP This Christmas (2015).

Decker shared a clip showing her children recording the track "I Saw Mommy Kissing Santa Claus", and performed "Tangled in Tinsel" live on the 97th Macy's Thanksgiving Day Parade in November 2023.

The EP includes her previously released 2020 single "Santa Claus Is Coming to Town".

== Critical reception ==
According to The Detroit News, "Jessie James Decker possesses one of the finest voices in country music today, which she showcases in such grand style on this six-track EP. The music ranges from the cutesy 'I Saw Mommy Kissing Santa Claus"' to a Springsteen-worthy version of "'Santa Claus Is Coming to Town'. Yet, our top pick on the album is the gorgeous take on "'Away In a Manger.'"

== Track listing ==
No.	Title	Length
1.	"Top of My List"	3:15
2.	"Sleigh Ride"	3:02
3.	"I Saw Mommy Kissing Santa Claus" (featuring Vivianne Decker, Eric Decker II, Forrest Decker)	3:02
4.	"Tangled in Tinsel"	3:25
5.	"Away in a Manger" (featuring Karen Parker, Sydney Bass, Ali James)	2:41
6.	"Santa Claus Is Coming to Town"	2:50
Total length:		18
