= The Sisterhood (American duo) =

American country music duo

The Sisterhood Band
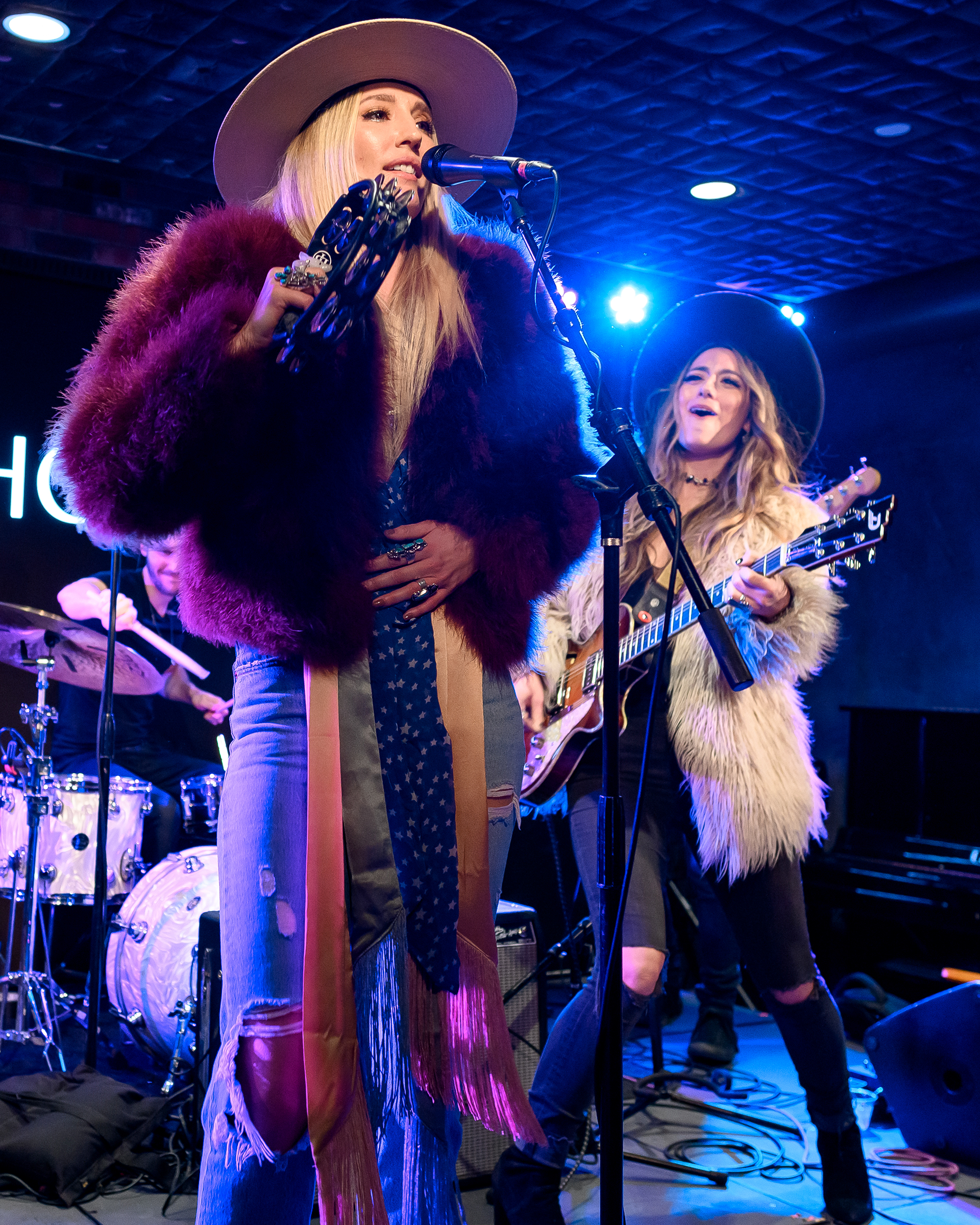
- The Sisterhood performing in 2019

Background information
- Origin: Nashville, Tennessee, U.S.
- Genres: Country music
- Years active: 2015–2021
- Label: Arista Nashville
- Past members: Alyssa Bonagura; Ruby Stewart
- Website: thesisterhoodband.com

The Sisterhood Band is an American country music duo made up of Alyssa Bonagura and Ruby Stewart. Alyssa is the daughter of Kathie Baillie and Michael Bonagura of Baillie & the Boys, while Ruby is the daughter of singer Rod Stewart.

== Origin ==
Alyssa Bonagura has been performing from the age of three, when she sang Lesley Gore's "It's My Party" on Ralph Emery's Nashville Now TV show. She also recorded a duet with Kenny Rogers at age 10, and by 16 went on her first tour opening for Marty Stuart. Bonagura also graduated from Paul McCartney's Liverpool Institute for Performing Arts in 2009. In 2016 she released her solo album Road Less Travelled and it reached no. 11 on the iTunes country chart. Her song "I Make My Own Sunshine" was used in a Lowes commercial.

Ruby Stewart is Rod Stewart's third daughter of four daughters. Her mother is Kelly Emberg. Ruby has been touring with her dad since she was 15. From the age of 18 she began modeling for Laura Ashley, Vanity Fair, Italia Vogue, Glamour and Elle. Her first performance was with her dad when she was 7; they sang "Sweet Little Rock and Roller". At the age of 13 Donnie Ienner of Columbia Records heard Ruby's demo and signed her to a development deal, but her mother and father decided it was to early for her to enter the music business. Ruby formed a rock band called Revoltaire which released one album titled Painted Hour Glass. Ruby Stewart's cover of the song "Whatever Lola Wants" was featured in a Pepsi commercial.

Ruby and Alyssa formed The Sisterhood Band in 2015. Within that first year, they recorded their first EP. They describe their music as 'an organic blend of the open melodies of classic West Coast folk and the magnetic swagger of timeless rock n'roll.'

== Career ==
After the duo performed one of Rod Stewart's classics "Gasoline Alley" in front of him, which moved him to tears, they began working on their new six-song EP in Nashville. The EP includes a cover of "Gasoline Alley." The duo have since performed as the opening act for Ruby's dad Rod Stewart on his UK tour.

On June 17, 2017, The Sisterhood signed a deal with Sony Music Nashville and released the Summer Setlist EP on June 8, 2018. They made their debut on the Grand Ole Opry on August 20, 2017, playing alongside Darius Rucker, Wynonna Judd and Little Big Town.

== Discography ==
- The Sisterhood EP (June 3, 2016)
- Summer Setlist EP (June 8, 2018)
