= Boys in the Summer =

Single by Jessie James
- Released: June 29, 2010
- Genre: Country pop
- Length: 3:02
- Label: Def Jam; Mercury; Show Dog-Universal
- Songwriters: Jessie James; James Michael
- Producers: John Fields (Pop/Single version); Mark Wright (Country version)

Jessie James singles chronology
"My Cowboy" (2009)	"Boys in the Summer" (2010)	"When You Say My Name" (2012)

"Boys in the Summer" is a song co-written and recorded by American country pop singer Jessie James. It was released June 29, 2010 through Def Jam Recordings and Mercury Records as the intended lead single from her unreleased second studio album, Daughter of a Gypsy.

Different mixes of the song were produced for pop and country radio formats, positioning James as a potential crossover artist following the mainstream success of her debut single, "Wanted", the previous year. The song was James' first to impact the country music genre, reaching number 58 on the Billboard Hot Country Songs chart in addition to charting at number 16 on the Bubbling Under Hot 100 all-genre chart. Her subsequent releases would continue targeting that market.

== Composition ==
"Boys in the Summer" is a country pop song written by Jessie James and James Michael. The single version was produced by John Fields, while the radio-exclusive country mix was produced by Mark Wright.

== Music video ==
Two slightly different music videos were produced for the song (one for the pop version and one for the country), both directed by Roman White. They were filmed on May 18, 2010 and premiered June 18, 2010 as part of CMT's Big New Music Weekend. The videos highlight the song's message of enjoying the joys of summers.

== Critical reception ==
Amar Toor of AOL Radio Blog gave a positive review for the single, saying that "Boys in the Summer" "[was] one of those rare tracks that seem to capture everything good and pure about summer."

== Chart performance ==
Chart (2010)	Peak position
US Billboard Bubbling Under Hot 100	16
US Hot Country Songs (Billboard)	58

== Release history ==
Country	Date	Format	Label(s)	Ref.
Canada	June 29, 2010	Digital download	Island Def Jam Music Group	
United States	June 29, 2010	Digital download	Mercury Records	
United States	July 13, 2010	Contemporary hit radio	Mercury Records; Island Def Jam Music Group	
United States	July 13, 2010	Country radio	Mercury Records; Show Dog-Universal Music	
United States	August 10, 2010	Hot adult contemporary	Mercury Records; Island Def Jam Music Group	
