= Southern Girl City Lights =

Studio album by Jessie James Decker
- Released: October 13, 2017
- Recorded: 2017
- Genre: Country pop
- Length: 42:25
- Label: Epic
- Producer: Daniel Agee; Matt McVaney; Alyssa Bonagura

Jessie James Decker chronology
Blackbird Sessions (2017)	Southern Girl City Lights (2017)	On This Holiday (2018)

Singles from Jessie James
- 1. "Southern Girl City Lights" Released: September 1, 2017

Southern Girl City Lights is the sixth release overall and second studio album by American country music artist Jessie James Decker. It is Decker's first full-length album since her self-titled debut album in 2009. It was released on October 13, 2017, through Epic Records.

== Content ==
Decker described Southern Girl City Lights to People as a "full-circle" project that bridges that gap between the pop music influences of her debut and the country pop sound she has developed on previous releases, with songs that represent the "tremendous" changes in her life since her last full-length release. The album contains a collaboration with country artist Randy Houser, who also co-wrote the single "My Cowboy" from Decker's debut album, which song she credits with helping her land her first record deal.

== Singles ==
The title track, "Southern Girl City Lights", was made available for download on September 1, 2017. Two additional promotional singles, "Almost Over You" and "All Filled Up", were released on September 15, 2017. On September 22, 2017, "Hungry" was released as the fourth promotional single. "Pretty Girl" was released as the album's fifth & final promotional single on October 6, 2017.

A music video was filmed for the Target exclusive track, "Flip My Hair", and premiered January 12, 2018. The song was later released as a standalone digital single on February 2, 2018, making it available outside of the physical Target edition of the album.

== Commercial performance ==
Southern Girl City Lights debuted at number 18 on the Billboard 200 chart dated November 4, 2017 with 21,000 album-equivalent units of which 18,000 were traditional sales. These represent career-high figures for the singer, while the chart peak also surpasses the 23 debut of Jessie James. The album also debuted at number one on the Top Country Albums chart, earning Decker her first Billboard chart topper. The album has sold 31,200 copies in the United States as of January 2018. It also charted on the New Zealand Heatseekers Albums chart at number 9.

== Track listing ==
No.	Title	Writer(s)	Length
1.	"Southern Girl City Lights"	Jessie James Decker; Daniel Agee; Sydney Bass	3:53
2.	"Fall in Love"	Decker	4:00
3.	"Hold a Candle"	Jeremy Spillman; Maren Morris	3:12
4.	"Almost Over You" (featuring Randy Houser)	Sarah Buxton; Abe Stoklasa; Daniel Tashian	3:31
5.	"All Filled Up"	Decker; Micah Wilshire	4:05
6.	"Open All Night"	Morris; Tashian; Angelo Petraglia	3:17
7.	"Another Dumb Love Song"	Decker; Agee; Alyssa Bonagura	3:29
8.	"Do You"	Decker; Wilshire	3:26
9.	"Hungry"	Decker; Matthew McVaney; Shane Pittman	3:03
10.	"Pretty Girl"	Decker	3:05
11.	"Use Your Words"	Decker; McVaney	3:02
12.	"Girl Like Me"	Decker; Bonagura	4:22
Total length:			42:25

Target deluxe edition bonus tracks
No.	Title	Writer(s)	Length
13.	"Flip My Hair"	Decker; Bonagura; Wilshire	3:04
Total length:			45:29

== Charts ==
Chart (2017)	Peak position
New Zealand Heatseeker Albums (RMNZ)	9
US Billboard 200	18
US Top Country Albums (Billboard)	1
