= Emberg =

Emberg is a surname. Notable people with the name include:

- Bella Emberg (1937–2018), English comedy actress
- Kelly Emberg (born 1959), American former model
