= Gold (Jessie James Decker EP) =

EP by Jessie James Decker
- Released: January 17, 2017
- Recorded: 2015–2017 in Nashville, TN
- Genre: Country pop
- Length: 16:51
- Label: Epic
- Producer: Daniel Agee

Jessie James Decker chronology
This Christmas (2015)	Gold (2017)	Blackbird Sessions (2017)

Singles from Gold
- 1. "Lights Down Low" Released: August 14, 2015

Gold is the fourth release overall and third extended play by American country music singer Jessie James Decker. The EP was released on February 17, 2017, through Epic Records. It was preceded in 2015 by the top 40 country single, "Lights Down Low". Gold includes collaborations with Alyssa Bonagura and Maren Morris.

The EP has sold 17,800 copies in the United States as of June 2017.

== Track listing ==
No.	Title	Writer(s)	Length
1.	"Shoot Out the Lights"	Marty Dodson; Maren Morris; Brett Tyler	3:14
2.	"Girl on the Coast"	Jessie James Decker	3:24
3.	"Too Young to Know"	Morris; Jesse Frasure; Tiffany Vartanyan	3:11
4.	"Lights Down Low"	Decker; Alyssa Bonagura	3:23
5.	"Gold"	Bonagura; Brandon Hood; Jeffrey Steele	3:39
Total length:			16:51

== Charts ==
Chart (2017)	Peak position
New Zealand Heatseekers Albums (RMNZ)	7
US Billboard 200	33
US Top Country Albums (Billboard)	5

=== Singles ===
Year	Single	Peak chart positions
Year	Single	US Country
2015	"Lights Down Low"	38
