= Comin' Home (EP) =

EP by Jessie James Decker
- Released: April 18, 2014
- Genre: Country, pop
- Length: 19:09
- Label: 19 Recordings

Jessie James Decker chronology
Jessie James (2009)	Comin' Home (2014)	This Christmas (2015)

Comin' Home is the second release overall and first extended play from American country music artist Jessie James Decker (previously credited as Jessie James). Released on April 18, 2014 via 19 Recordings, the album reached No. 5 on the Billboard Top Country Albums chart. On January 30, 2021, a deluxe edition was released including two of James' previous singles, added into the track list.

== Track listing ==
No.	Title	Writer(s)	Length
1.	"Girls Night"	Jessica Decker, Ted Bruner	3:02
2.	"Rain on the Roof of This Car"	Alyssa Bonagura, Michael Bonagura, Jedd Hughes	3:33
3.	"Coming Home"		3:10
4.	"Diary"	A. Bonagura, Bruner	3:27
5.	"Breaking Your Heart"	Decker, Bruner	3:43
6.	"Mama Wrote You a Lullaby"	Decker, A. Bonagura	2:14
Total length:			19:09

2021 deluxe edition
No.	Title	Writer(s)	Length
1.	"Girls Night"	Jessica Decker, Ted Bruner	3:02
2.	"Clint Eastwood"	Jesse Frasure, Maureen Morris, Tina Parol	3:39
3.	"Rain on the Roof of This Car"	Alyssa Bonagura, Michael Bonagura, Jedd Hughes	3:33
4.	"Coming Home"		3:10
5.	"Diary"	A. Bonagura, Bruner	3:27
6.	"Breaking Your Heart"	Decker, Bruner	3:43
7.	"I Do"	Decker, A. Bonagura	3:51
8.	"Mama Wrote You a Lullaby"	Decker, A. Bonagura	2:14
Total length:			26:39

== Chart performance ==
Comin' Home sold 11,000 copies in its first week of release.

Chart (2014)	Peak position
US Billboard 200	28
US Top Country Albums (Billboard)	5
US Independent Albums (Billboard)	4
