= The Woman I've Become (EP) =

EP by Jessie James Decker
- Released: October 22, 2021
- Genre: Country
- Length: 21:43
- Label: Warner Nashville
- Producers: Julian Bunetta; Sam Ellis; Scott Hendricks; Dann Huff; Matthew McVaney; Dave Pittenger; TMS

Jessie James Decker chronology
On This Holiday (2018)	The Woman I've Become (2021)	Decker the Halls (2023)

The Woman I've Become is the eighth release overall and fifth extended play by American country music singer Jessie James Decker, and her first release on Warner Music Nashville. The EP was released on October 22, 2021, through Warner Nashville. The Woman I've Become features seven songs, including "Should Have Known Better" which peaked on the Billboard Country Digital Song Sales chart at number six. On October 23, 2021, Decker announced The Woman I've Become Tour would begin on April 14, 2022, consisting of 24 shows in support of the EP.

== Promotion and release ==
Two songs with accompanying music videos, "Should Have Known Better" and "Not in Love with You", were released ahead of the EP. A third music video was released for the title track as promotional only.

The official music video for "Should Have Known Better" premiered on YouTube on August 20, 2021. It was filmed against a sunset backdrop in Joshua Tree, and the music video features Decker metaphorically shedding a past relationship as well as her clothes before diving into a swimming pool.

The official music video for "Not in Love with You" premiered on YouTube on September 30, 2021. "The first time I saw the video I had an instant smile on my face", Decker told CMT. "I just felt like it was so magical and real and raw." Decker stated that she wanted to highlight "the vulnerability of being somewhere in the middle of being heartbroken while also not being in love with someone anymore". She continued, "I wanted the visual to be a big reflection of vulnerability and sharing those emotions."

The official music video for "The Woman I've Become" premiered on YouTube on October 22, 2021. Decker wrote on Instagram, "Im not The best videographer, editor etc in general but what I do love about this video is it’s raw and real and I made it and I’m proud of it and I do feel like it reflects the things most important to me in my life. That's the woman I have become."

On April 7, 2022 Decker posted a live acoustic performance of the lead single

Released to country radio on May 2, 2022 and as of May 3, 2022 the empowerment anthem “Should Have Known Better” has become the number one most added song on country radio.

== Critical reception ==
The Nash News stated that she defines vulnerability in relation to herself, her husband, her family, and more, in The Woman I've Become. The title track is dedicated to growing and maturing as a woman, mother, wife, and person. The review concluded, "Although she shares a great amount of her personal family life on Instagram, The Woman I've Become holds the most vulnerability we've heard from Decker in her entire career. It's a personal, yet relatable piece from beginning to end that we can't stop replaying to heal our own souls through Decker's passion and lyricism. With the help of Warner Music Nashville, Atlantic Records, The Big Yellow Dog—and most of all, her own personal life experiences—Jessie James Decker has created an unskippable album from beginning to end that takes us through every stage of a relationship. Butterflies to breakup, first love to marriage, even confidence and vulnerability, Decker envelopes us in her personal reflection of self-growth, inspiring us to do the same with every word."

Country Swag said, "Decker's new project features seven perfectly-crafted songs" and that "The Woman I've Become is our re-introduction to Jessie James Decker. She is a powerhouse vocalist that is sure to continue to be a mainstay in country music. The EP is definitely worth a listen!" It added, "The title-track is the most personal on the project. The song appears to be a message to Decker's father, who was absent in parts of her life. The lyrics touch on her marriage, her children, and the grieving process of not having a present father figure growing up. Although personal, the song is honest and relatable, and shows the influence Nashville has had on the singer over the years."

== Track listing ==
The Woman I've Become track listing
No.	Title	Writer(s)	Producer(s)	Length
1.	"Not in Love with You"	Sam Ellis; Jordyn Shellhart	Ellis	2:54
2.	"Tell You Enough"	Jordan Reynolds; Jordan Minton; Emily Weisband; Jon Hume	Dann Huff	3:07
3.	"Should Have Known Better"	Tom Barnes; Pete Kelleher; Benjamin Kohn; Madi Yanofsky	Matthew McVaney; Scott Hendricks; TMS; Scott Johnson^{[a]}	2:27
4.	"Dance with Someone Else"	Tenille Townes; Tina Parol-Gemza; Dave Pittenger	Pittenger	3:13
5.	"The Woman I've Become"	Jessie James Decker; Jonathan Quarmby	McVaney	3:20
6.	"Girls Like to Dance"	Maren Morris; Julian Bunetta; John Ryan	Huff; Bunetta	3:46
7.	"I Need a Man"	Decker; Alyssa Bonagura; Matt McVaney; Shane Stevens	McVaney	2:54
Total length:				21:43

=== Note ===
- ^{^[a]} signifies an assistant producer

== Personnel ==
Credits adapted from Tidal.

=== Musicians ===
- Jessie James Decker – lead vocals
- Sam Ellis – acoustic guitar, background vocals, electric guitar, keyboards, mandolin, programming (track 1)
- Justin Schipper – electric guitar, pedal steel guitar (1)
- Ilya Toshinskiy – acoustic guitar (2, 3, 6), electric guitar (2); banjo, hi-string guitar (3)
- Jimmie Lee Sloas – bass (2, 3, 6)
- Jerry Roe – drums (2, 5–7)
- Dann Huff – electric guitar (2, 6)
- Charlie Judge – keyboards (2, 6)
- David Huff – programming (2, 6)
- Paul Franklin – steel guitar (2, 6)
- Trey Keller – background vocals (2)
- Rob McNelley – electric guitar (2)
- TMS – background vocals, programming, synthesizer (3)
- Gordon Mote – Hammond B3 organ, piano, synthesizer (3)
- Nir Z – drums, percussion (3)
- Derek Wells – electric guitar (3)
- Kris Donegan – electric guitar (3)
- Blake Bollinger – programming (3)
- Dave Pittenger – acoustic guitar, bass, electric guitar, percussion, piano, programming (4)
- Tina Parol – background vocals (4)
- Devin Malone – acoustic guitar, electric guitar (3)
- Matthew McVaney – acoustic guitar, background vocals, bass, keyboards, programming (5, 7); pedal steel guitar (5); banjo, electric guitar (7)
- Justin Ostrander – electric guitar (5, 7)
- Julian Bunetta – acoustic guitar (6)
- Sarah Haze – background vocals (6)
- Tom Bukovac – electric guitar (6)
- Jonathan Wyndham – electric guitar (7)
- Jonathan Yudkin – fiddle (7)
- Marquis Brown – programming (7)

=== Technical ===
- Erik Madrid – mixing (1)
- Sean Moffitt – mixing (2, 6)
- Jeff Juliano – mixing (3)
- Dave Pittenger – mixing, engineering (4)
- Matthew McVaney – mixing, engineering, digital editing (5, 7); additional tracking (3)
- Andrew Mendelson – mastering
- Sam Ellis – engineering (1)
- Drew Bollman – engineering (2)
- Jeff Balding – engineering (3)
- Buckley Miller – engineering (6)
- Chris Small – digital editing (2, 6)
- David Huff – digital editing (2, 6)
- Scott Hendricks – digital editing, additional tracking (3)
- Brian David Willis – digital editing (3)
- Trey Keller – additional tracking (2)
- TMS – additional tracking (3)
- Ben Caver – additional tracking (6)
- Jesse Brock – mixing assistance (2, 6)
- Kam Luchterhand – engineering assistance (2)
- Ryan Yount – engineering assistance (3)
- Sean Badum – engineering assistance (6)
- David Cook – studio assistance (3)
