= On This Holiday =

Studio album by Jessie James Decker
- Released: 26 October 2018
- Recorded: 2018
- Genre: Christmas music
- Length: 37:07
- Label: Epic
- Producer: Daniel Tashian

Jessie James Decker chronology
Southern Girl City Lights (2017)	On This Holiday (2018)	The Woman I've Become (2021)

On This Holiday is the third studio album from American country musician Jessie James Decker. It is her seventh release overall and first full-length Christmas album, following her 2015 EP This Christmas. The album is a collection of Christmas songs with new original songs; it has sold over 2,400 copies. The four new tracks were written along with Daniel Tashian.

Decker performed songs from the album on December 5, 2018, at The City Winery in Nashville, Tennessee.

== Promotion and release ==
The track, "Baby! It's Christmas", was updated from the 2014 release and made available for download with the pre-order on October 15, 2018. The full album was released on October 26, 2018 through Epic Records.

Other versions include an autographed vinyl LP with early access to the 2019 tour, an autographed booklet and a Target exclusive bonus track.

The album peaked at No. 10 on the Billboard Holiday Album Sales chart, selling 1,800 copies in its first week.

== Critical reception ==
Artvoice describes the album as a "joyous revelation, with Jessie displaying both her countrified command of the holiday repertoire and her ability to bring more intimate nuances to beloved classics ingrained in her own holiday memories, each song soaring as an illuminating renewal of the season".

Annie Reuter of One Country states that "the singer shows off her fashion sense with a series of costume changes while posing for a photo shoot" with Forrest Bradley Decker making an appearance. Reuter goes on to say that "The pop-country track showcases Jessie’s soulful singing style with several powerful belts" and that "the singer’s laid-back personality and infectious spirit is highlighted".

According to people.com it is one of the 12 Celebrity Christmas Albums You'll Want to Play on Repeat This Holiday Season and staccatofy.com also said "On This Holiday is chalk-full[sic] of golden holiday nuggets. Kicking off with “It’s the Most Wonderful Time of the Year,” it sets the tone for a celebratory sound. Decker is poised and resonates a confidence with crystalline pitch and shimmering phrasing. The tunes range from fun and flirty, “Santa Baby,” to a more serious tone on “Do You Hear What I Hear.” Decker's voice is commanding with the ability to embellish her phrases with ornaments of inflection and soulfulness. Tunes like “Wonderful Day,” offering a traveling song vibe, with jangling guitars and an easy-going spirit. On This Holiday, is a delightful way to soundtrack the holiday, with just enough Country to keep it warm and just enough pop to keep it bright."

== Track listing ==
No.	Title	Writer(s)	Length
1.	"It's the Most Wonderful Time of the Year"		2:43
2.	"The Christmas Song (Chestnuts Roasting on an Open Fire)"		3:02
3.	"Santa Baby"		3:29
4.	"Snowlight"	Jessie James Decker, Daniel Tashian	4:05
5.	"Do You Hear What I Hear?"		3:19
6.	"Rockin' Around the Christmas Tree"		2:30
7.	"Wonderful Day"	Jessie James Decker, Daniel Tashian	3:54
8.	"I'll Be Home for Christmas"		3:45
9.	"Christmas in Cabo"	Jessie James Decker, Daniel Tashian	3:44
10.	"Baby! It's Christmas"	Jessie James Decker, Daniel Tashian	3:07
Total length:			33:40

Target deluxe edition bonus tracks
No.	Title	Length
11.	"My Favorite Holiday"	3:27
Total length:		37:07

== Charts ==
Chart (2018)	Peak position
Holiday Album Sales	10
Top Holiday Albums	15
Country Album Sales	11
Top Current Albums	80

=== Singles ===
Year	Single	Peak chart positions
Year	Single	US Holiday Digital
2014	"Baby! It's Christmas"	3
2017	"My Favorite Holiday"	6
