= Love Hard (album) =

Studio album by Alyssa Bonagura
- Released: October 30, 2012
- Recorded: 2010–12; Franklin, TN, Nashville, TN
- Genre: Pop, acoustic, pop rock
- Length: 39:45
- Label: Rondor Music International
- Producer: Alyssa Bonagura

Alyssa Bonagura chronology
The English Diaries (2010)	Love Hard (2012)

Singles from Love Hard
- 1. "Killing Me" Released: June 4, 2011; 2. "I Make My Own Sunshine" Released: February 28, 2012; 3. "We Stop Time" Released: October 15, 2012

Love Hard is the second album by American singer Alyssa Bonagura. Bonagura gained minor fame when her song "I Make My Own Sunshine" was featured in a Lowe's commercial in 2012, and is also the title-track of Chelsea Basham's debut album, The album, her first major release, was released on October 30, 2012.

== Track listing ==
No.	Title	Writer(s)	Producer(s)	Length
1.	"Warrior"	Alyssa Bonagura, Tami Hinesh	Bonagura	3:33
2.	"We Stop Time"	Bonagura, Hinesh	Bonagura	3:52
3.	"Got That Feeling"	Bonagura, Ian Fitchuk, Justin Loucks	Bonagura	3:27
4.	"I Make My Own Sunshine (Johns Fields Remix)"	Bonagura	John Fields	2:27
5.	"This Time"	Bonagura, Jenny Yates	Bonagura	3:10
6.	"When You're Gone"	Bonagura, Yates	Bonagura	3:30
7.	"Armour of Love"	Bonagura	Bonagura	4:09
8.	"Get Off That Train"	Bonagura, Kathie Baillie, Patricia Conroy	Bonagura	3:29
9.	"I Can Take the Rain"	Bonagura	Bonagura	3:49
10.	"Killing Me (feat. Tyler Wilkinson)"	Bonagura, Tyler Wilkinson	Bonagura, Wilkinson	5:17
11.	"Over the Rainbow"	Bonagura	Bonagura	3:02
Total length:				39:45
