= Ruby Stewart =

American fashion model and singer (born 1987)

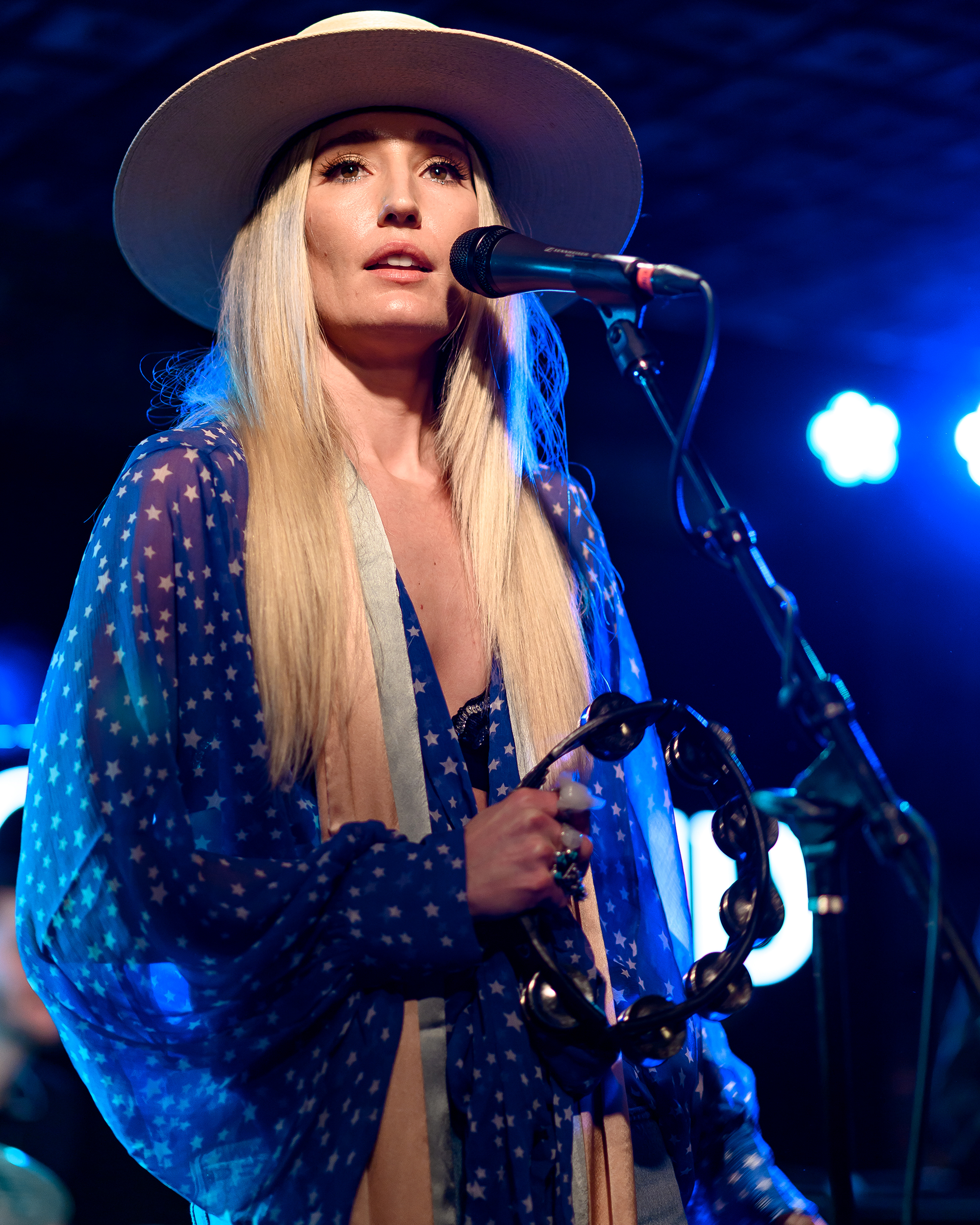
- Stewart in 2019
- Born: June 17, 1987 (age 39); Los Angeles, California, U.S.
- Parents: Rod Stewart (father); Kelly Emberg (mother)
- Musical career
- Genres: Rock; country
- Occupations: Singer; model
- Years active: 2005–present

Ruby Stewart (born June 17, 1987) is an American fashion model and singer.

== Early life ==
Ruby Stewart was born in Los Angeles, California, and grew up there. She was the fourth child, and third daughter, born to her father, rock singer Rod Stewart and former model Kelly Emberg.

== Career ==
Ruby followed in her mother's footsteps by becoming a high fashion model. She signed to Nous Model Management in Los Angeles and Select Model Management in London. Her older half-sister Kimberly Stewart is also a model. Stewart did runways for Karen Walker for her Spring/Summer 2006 collection for London Fashion Week during 2005. Walker praised her "unpretentious youthfulness".

In 2007, Stewart was a lingerie model for Ultimo. The campaign was specifically for Ultimo's Michelle for George line, sold at Asda.

In the summer of 2010, Stewart formed the Los Angeles–based band, Revoltaire, along with Jason Yates (guitar, keys) and Chris Cano (drums). The band completed an album's worth of material titled "Painted Hour Glass", with Stewart as the vocalist and lyricist. In 2012, Revoltaire disbanded.

In 2012, she sang the voice-over for the song "Whatever Lola Wants" in a Diet Pepsi commercial that featured Sofia Vergara.

On March 13, 2016, she performed in her first music festival with bandmate Alyssa Bonagura at the CMC Rocks festival in Queensland, Australia. Billing themselves as The Sisterhood, the two performed a one-hour set with backing by the Morgan Evans band.
