= Blackbird Sessions =

EP by Jessie James Decker
- Released: June 9, 2017
- Genre: Country pop
- Length: 18:44
- Label: Epic

Jessie James Decker chronology
| Gold (2017) | Blackbird Sessions (2017) | Southern Girl City Lights (2017) |

Blackbird Sessions is the fifth release overall and fourth extended play by American country music singer Jessie James Decker. The EP was released on June 9, 2017 through Epic Records. The collection was recorded at the titular Blackbird Studios and comprises four live cover versions of popular songs as well as a live re-recording of "Girl on the Coast" from Decker's previous EP, Gold (2017).

== Track listing ==
| No. | Title | Writer(s) | Length |
|---|---|---|---|
| 1. | "Blue Ain't Your Color" (live) | Steven Lee Olsen, Hillary Lindsey, Clint Lagerberg | 3:50 |
| 2. | "Love on the Brain" (live) | Fred Ball, Joseph Angel, Robyn Fenty | 3:43 |
| 3. | "You're Still the One" (live) | Robert John "Mutt" Lange, Shania Twain | 3:12 |
| 4. | "Who's Lovin You" (live) | William "Smokey" Robinson | 4:13 |
| 5. | "Girl On the Coast" (live) | Jessie James Decker | 3:45 |
| Total length: | | | 18:44 |

== Chart positions ==
| Chart (2017) | Peak position |
|---|---|
| US Billboard 200 | 173 |
| US Top Country Albums (Billboard) | 33 |
