= Lights Down Low (Jessie James Decker song) =

- 2016 single cover

Single by Jessie James Decker

from the album Gold
- Released: August 14, 2015
- Recorded: 2015; Nashville, Tennessee
- Genre: Country pop
- Length: 3:17 (2015 release)
- Label: Big Yellow Dog; Epic
- Songwriters: Jessie James Decker; Alyssa Bonagura
- Producer: Daniel Agee

Jessie James Decker singles chronology
"Clint Eastwood" (2015)	"Lights Down Low" (2015)

Alternate cover
- 2015 single cover

Music video
- "Lights Down Low" on YouTube

"Lights Down Low" is a song written and recorded by American recording artist and reality television personality Jessie James Decker. It was first released on August 14, 2015 through the independent label imprint Big Yellow Dog Music. The song, co-written by Alyssa Bonagura, was inspired by Decker's relationship with husband Eric Decker, with whom she stars on the E! network reality series, Eric & Jessie: Game On.

"Lights Down Low" debuted at number 38 on the Billboard Hot Country Songs chart, giving Decker her largest country music hit to date. In 2016, Decker signed a record deal with Epic Records and re-released the single through that label on June 17, 2016. The song serves as the lead single for Decker's third extended play, Gold (2017). A music video directed by PR Brown premiered in July 2016 starring Decker and her husband.

== Critical reception ==
Matt Bjorke of country music blog Roughstock praised the song for showcasing who Decker is as an artist and noted the vocals and production were both "strong."

== Commercial performance ==
"Lights Down Low" reached number one on the iTunes Country sales chart shortly after release, notably out-selling The Band Perry's major label-supported single "Live Forever" during its first three days. The song debuted on the Billboard Country Digital Songs chart at number 15 with 18,000 units sold during the chart week (but 21,000 sales total, due to being released three days before the chart week began) for the week of August 24, 2015. As of October 12, 2015, "Lights Down Low" has sold over 35,000 units. It debuted and peaked at number 38 on the Billboard Hot Country Songs chart dated September 5, 2015.

== Track listing ==
Digital download – single (2015)
No.	Title	Length
1.	"Lights Down Low"	3:17

Digital download – single (2016)
No.	Title	Length
1.	"Lights Down Low"	3:23

== Music video ==
The accompanying music video was directed by PR Brown and filmed in southern California. It premiered July 12, 2016. The video stars Decker and her real-life husband, American football player Eric Decker, and gives a "glimpse of her home life" with scenes depicting a quiet date night at home.

== Live performances ==
Decker appeared on The Today Show on August 31, 2016 to perform the song live.

== Charts ==
Chart (2015)	Peak position
US Hot Country Songs (Billboard)	38

== Release history ==
Country	Date	Format	Label	Ref.
Various	August 14, 2015	Digital download	Big Yellow Dog	
Various	June 17, 2016	Digital download (re-release)	Epic	
United States	August 31, 2016	Radio premiere (via PlayMPE)	Epic; New Revolution	
United States	October 24, 2016	Country radio	Epic; New Revolution	
