= Jessie James Decker =

American country pop singer (born 1988)

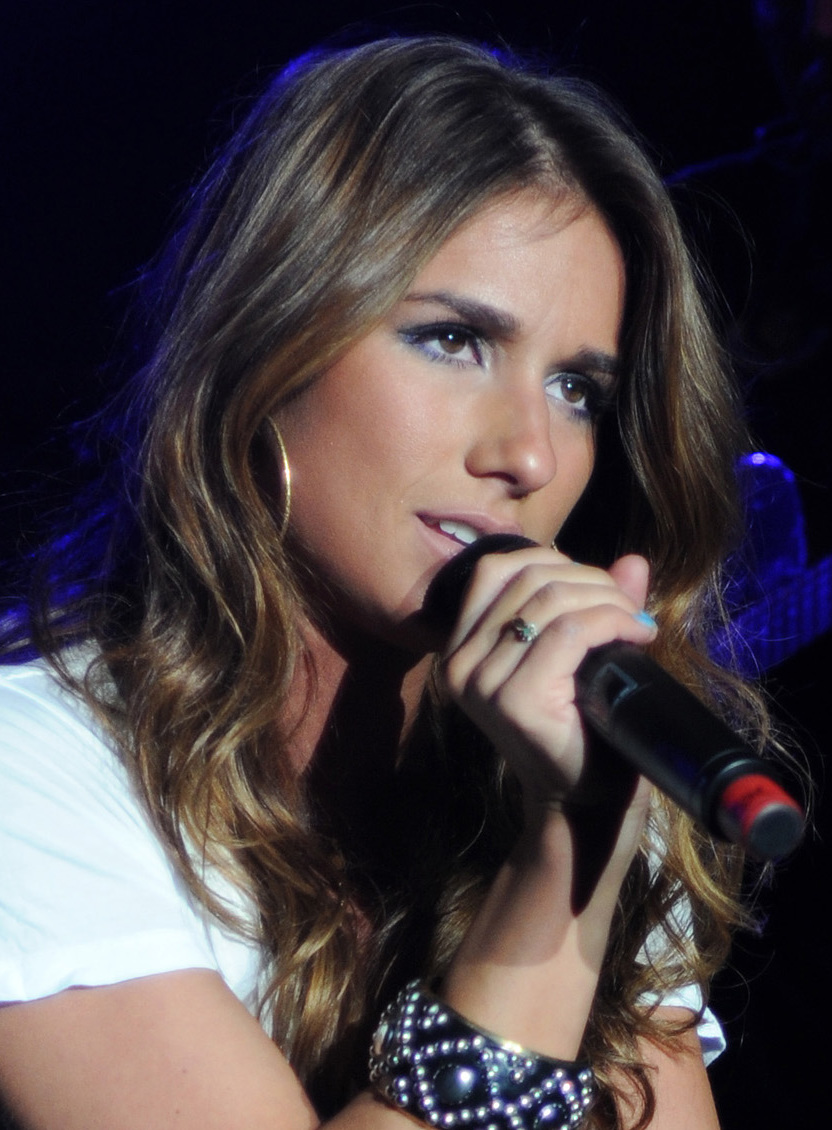
- Decker in 2009

Background information
- Also known as: Jessie James
- Born: Jessica Rose James; April 12, 1988 (age 38); Vicenza, Italy
- Genres: Country; pop
- Occupation: Singer
- Years active: 2003–present
- Labels: Mercury; Island Def Jam; Show Dog-Universal Music; Epic; Warner Music Nashville
- Spouse: Eric Decker (m. 2013)
- Website: jessiejamesdecker.com

Jessica Rose James Decker (born April 12, 1988) is an Italian-Born American country pop singer. At age 15, after auditioning for and being rejected by most of the country labels in Nashville, Tennessee, Decker began working with Carla Wallace of Big Yellow Dog Music. One of her songs attracted the attention of Mercury Records, which offered her a recording contract. She released her debut album, Jessie James, in 2009. A few years later in 2013, she starred with her husband Eric Decker, a wide receiver in the National Football League, in the E! reality show Eric & Jessie: Game On. She is no relation to the famous American outlaw Jesse James.

On April 18, 2014, Decker released an EP through iTunes entitled Comin' Home. On Epic in 2017, she released a five-track EP, Gold, followed by a collaboration on Austin John Winkler's 2016 song titled "Howlin'" from his debut EP Love Sick Radio and released a surprise live EP on June 9, 2017, titled Blackbird Sessions. On October 13, 2017, she released her second full-length album and first for Epic Records, Southern Girl City Lights. On This Holiday, her first full-length Christmas album, was released on October 26, 2018.

On October 22, 2021, she released the EP The Woman I've Become. The project spawned a headlining tour, which wrapped in August 2022 after hitting major cities across the nation. On September 30, 2022 "Grow Young With You" was the first official track from the Big Yellow Dog/Atlantic Records/Warner Music Nashville recording artist since the release of her The Woman I've Become EP the previous year. On November 2 she released her second holiday EP Decker the Halls.

== Early life ==
Decker was born Jessica Rose James on April 12, 1988, in Vicenza, in the Italian region of Veneto on an American military base to her mother, Karen Johnson and father Robert James. Her stepfather, Steve Parker, who Karen married in the early 2000s, served in the U.S. Air Force. As a result, she lived in Iowa, Kentucky, Texas, Louisiana, and Georgia. She graduated from Warner Robins High School in Warner Robins, Georgia, in 2007. Decker has two younger siblings, Sydney Rae Bass (born 1991) and John James (born 1994), two stepsiblings, Ashley and Alex Parker (from Steve's first marriage) and two siblings-in-law, Anthony Bass and Alison James (née Green).

Decker began singing when she was two. She won her first talent contest in Baker, Louisiana, at age nine, singing "I Want to Be a Cowboy's Sweetheart". By then, she had already been writing songs on a plastic guitar and had performed at SeaWorld and in Warner Robins, Georgia in 2000. At age fifteen, she made weekly trips to Nashville to hone her songwriting skills.

== Career ==
=== Music ===
At seventeen, Decker was introduced to Carla Wallace of independent label Big Yellow Dog Music, who helped her with her songwriting and singing. One of her songs, "Gypsy Girl", was written with two writers from Yellow Dog and made it into the hands of record executive David Massey, who brought her to the attention of L.A. Reid. She auditioned for Reid by singing her song "My Cowboy", produced by John Rich. Decker soon signed a contract with Mercury Records.

Even though she originally thought that she would be producing a country record, Decker was later told to record a pop album by record executives. She also claimed to have been asked to sound like pop singer Britney Spears. She described the recording process as "intense" due to the genre crossing. She described herself in an interview as "a country girl at heart," having grown up listening to this music.

Her debut album, Jessie James, was released in August 2009, debuting at number 23 on the Billboard 200. It was a fusion between country and pop music, with more emphasis placed on the latter as dictated by her label. The album also featured writing credits from Decker and seasoned pop songwriter Kara DioGuardi and Mitch Allan, among others. The album received mixed receptions from critics. Allmusic received the album positively, but found that despite being marketed as such and featuring some country-influenced production, the music on the album was a far cry from country music. Slant thought that the album only superficially pulled together influences from pop, country and hip-hop while failing to pander to any of those audiences. The album's first single, "Wanted", produced by Allan, had been released in April and peaked at number 40 on the Billboard Hot 100.

Decker later performed in the Middle East with singer Kid Rock and comedian Carlos Mencia for US troops stationed overseas.

Decker began working on her second album, Sweet American Dreams, in 2010, which was initially planned to be released in late summer. The album was to have the same country-pop sound as her debut, with Decker being given more leeway by Mercury in incorporating country sounds. The first single, "Boys in the Summer", released in June, was a minor country success but failed to chart on the Billboard Hot 100. Having struggled with accepting her career path as a pop singer, Decker told her label in the midst of preparations for her album that she did not want to be a pop artist and wanted to record country music. After negotiations, Massey asked Mark Wright from Show Dog-Universal Music, which had facilitated the country release of "Boys in the Summer" in November, to help Mercury/IDJ launch Decker in the country genre. Decker began recording in April 2011. "When You Say My Name" was produced by Wright and released on January 31, 2012. "Military Man" was released on May 22, 2012. She was removed from the Show Dog Universal roster in 2013. Decker released an extended play, Comin' Home, on April 18, 2014, which hit number one on iTunes top albums chart and debuted in the top 5 on Billboard's top country albums chart.

Decker was featured on former Hinder lead singer Austin John's debut solo EP Love Sick Radio, on the track "Howlin'". The EP was released April 22, 2016. She finished the Lights Down Low tour. On her new label Epic she released a five-track EP, Gold, on February 17, 2017, and released a surprise live EP on June 9, 2017, titled Blackbird Sessions. On October 13, 2017, she released her second full-length album and first for Epic Records, Southern Girl City Lights. On November 27, 2017, Decker appeared in 12 Days of Cracker Barrel campaign, ending on December 8. Each day got a new YouTube video in the style of the original "The Twelve Days of Christmas" song.

On April 3, 2022, Decker performed "America the Beautiful", in front of a nearly 80,000 crowd at WWE's WrestleMania 38, at AT&T Stadium, in Dallas, Texas. On November 23, 2023, during the 97th Macy's Thanksgiving Day Parade she celebrated the holidays with a performance of “Tangled in Tinsel” live for the first time.

=== Reality television ===
In 2013, Decker starred with her husband Eric Decker, a wide receiver in the National Football League, in the E! reality show Eric & Jessie: Game On. It ended its run in April 2014, but returned in September 2017. It ran for 20 episodes in three seasons.

On September 8, 2022, Decker was announced as a contestant on season 31 of Dancing with the Stars. She was partnered with Alan Bersten. She finished in 10th place.

=== Kittenish ===
Decker launched a clothing line called Kittenish online. Kittenish opened its first physical location in Nashville, Tennessee. A second branch is located near Destin, Florida.

== Musical style and influences ==
Decker co-wrote the majority of the songs on her debut album. The album is of a country-pop fusion genre, revealing her taste for not only country music, but pop and soul music as well.

The beat for "Blue Jeans" was a recording of Decker stepping; this talent stems from her time on the step team at her school. Initially, she faced opposition for her soul music-inspired vocal runs when trying to get signed in Nashville.

She has listed Christina Aguilera, Jessica Simpson, Bobbie Gentry, Janis Joplin, Shelby Lynne, and Shania Twain as her musical influences. She has said that she initially wanted a career similar to those of Gentry and Twain, who were signed to pop labels but found crossover success in both country and pop music.

== Personal life ==
On June 22, 2013, Jessie married Eric Decker, an NFL wide receiver who at the time played for the Denver Broncos. They have four children.

== Discography ==
=== Studio albums ===
Title	Details	Peak positions				Sales
Title	Details	US	US Country	US Holiday	NZ Heat	Sales
Jessie James	Release date: August 11, 2009; Label: Mercury; Formats: CD, digital download	23	—	—	—	US: 120,000
Southern Girl City Lights	Release date: October 13, 2017; Label: Epic; Formats: CD, digital download	18	1	—	9	US: 31,200
On This Holiday	Release date: October 26, 2018; Label: Epic; Formats: CD, digital download, vinyl	—	—	10	—	US: 4,100
"—" denotes releases that did not chart

=== Extended plays ===
Title	Details	Peak chart positions					Sales
Title	Details	US	US Country	US Holiday	US Indie	NZ Heat	Sales
Comin' Home	Release date: April 18, 2014; Label: 19; Formats: Digital download	28	5	—	4	—	US: 50,000
This Christmas	Release date: December 4, 2015; Label: Big Yellow Dog; Formats: Digital download	178	16	42	7	—	US: 5,600
Gold	Release date: February 17, 2017; Label: Epic; Formats: Digital download	33	5	—	—	7	US: 17,800
Blackbird Sessions	Release date: June 9, 2017; Label: Epic; Formats: Digital download	175	33	—	—	—	US: 4,000
The Woman I've Become	Release date: October 22, 2021; Label: Warner Nashville; Formats: Digital download	— (Note: The Woman I've Become did not enter the Billboard 200, but peaked at number 88 on the Top Album Sales component chart.)	—	—	—	—	
Decker the Halls	Release date: November 2, 2023; Label: Warner Nashville; Formats: Digital download	—	—	—	—	—	
"—" denotes releases that did not chart

=== Singles ===
Year	Single	Peak chart positions							Certifications (sales threshold)	Album
Year	Single	US	US Pop	US Dance	US Country Songs	US Country Airplay	US Country Digital	CAN	Certifications (sales threshold)	Album
2009	"Wanted"	40	23	18	—		—	82	RIAA: Gold	Jessie James
2009	"I Look So Good (Without You)"	— (Note: "I Look So Good (Without You)" did not enter the Billboard Hot 100, but charted at number 3 on the Bubbling Under Hot 100 Singles extension chart.)	—	—	—		—	—		Jessie James
2009	"My Cowboy"	—	—	—	—		—	—		Jessie James
2010	"Boys in the Summer"	— (Note: "Boys in the Summer" did not enter the Billboard Hot 100, but charted at number 16 on the Bubbling Under Hot 100 Singles extension chart.)	—	—	58		—	—		Non-album singles
2012	"When You Say My Name"	—	—	—	—		—	—		Non-album singles
2012	"Military Man"	—	—	—	49		—	—		Non-album singles
2013	"I Do"	—	—	—	39	—	30	—		Non-album singles
2015	"Clint Eastwood"	—	—	—	—	—	37	—		Non-album singles
2015	"Lights Down Low"	—	—	—	38	—	15	—		Gold
2017	"Southern Girl City Lights"	—	—	—	—	—	—	—		Southern Girl City Lights
2018	"Flip My Hair"	—	—	—	—	—	23	—		Southern Girl City Lights
2018	"Boots"	—	—	—	—	—	—	—		Non-album singles
2019	"Roots and Wings"	—	—	—	—	—	24	—		Non-album singles
2019	"Old Town Road"	—	—	—	—	—	—	—		Non-album singles
2021	"Should Have Known Better"	—	—	—	—	59	6	—		The Woman I've Become
2022	"Grow Young With You"	—	—	—	—	—	—	—		Non-album singles
2023	"I'm Gonna Love You"	—	—	—	—	—	—	—		Non-album singles
"—" denotes releases that did not chart

==== Holiday singles ====
Year	Single	Peak chart positions		Album
Year	Single	US Country Digital	US Holiday Digital	Album
2014	"Baby! It's Christmas"	41	3	This Christmas
2015	"This Christmas"	—	5	This Christmas
2016	"Baby, It's Cold Outside" (Jessie James Decker featuring Eric Decker)	—	14	This Christmas
2017	"My Favorite Holiday"	—	6	On This Holiday
2020	"Santa Claus Is Coming To Town"	—	15	Non-album singles
2021	"Christmas Every Day"	—	—	Non-album singles
"—" denotes releases that did not chart

=== Music videos ===
Year	Video	Director
2009	"Wanted"	Travis Kopach
2009	"I Look So Good (Without You)"	Chris Baldwin
2009	"My Cowboy"	Colin Tilley
2010	"Boys in the Summer"	Roman White
2010	"Dear John"	Roman Dent
2011	"When You Say My Name"	Kristin Barlowe
2015	"Clint Eastwood"	Marcel Chagnon
2016	"Lights Down Low"	P. R. Brown
2017	"Flip My Hair"	Dallas Wilson
2018	"Baby! It's Christmas"	Tyler Conrad
2020	"Santa Claus Is Coming to Town"	Sean Hagwell
2021	"Should Have Known Better"	Kevin + King
2021	"Not In Love With You"	Kevin + King
2021	"The Woman I've Become"	Jessie James Decker
2022	"I Still Love You" (with Billy Currington)	Stone Shannon
2023	“Islands In The Stream”	Unknown
2023	“I’m Gonna Love You”	Unknown
2023	“(Can't Do Life) Without You”	Unknown

=== Other appearances ===
Title	Year	Other artist(s)	Album
"Come Undone"	2010	My Darkest Days	My Darkest Days
"Good Night"	2015	Billy Currington	Summer Forever
"Howlin'"	2016	Austin John	Love Sick Radio
"I'll Chase the Sky"	2017	—N/a	My Little Pony: The Movie
"Breath of Heaven (Mary's Song)"	2017	—N/a	The Star soundtrack
"Hoy Será"	2023	Antonio Orozco	La Canción que Nunca Viste
“If You’re Up”	2024	Logan Mize	TBD
