= This Christmas (Jessie James Decker EP) =

EP by Jessie James Decker
- Released: December 4, 2015
- Genre: Christmas music
- Length: 23:32
- Label: Big Yellow Dog

Jessie James Decker chronology
Comin' Home (2014)	This Christmas (2015)	Gold (2017)

Singles from This Christmas
- 1. "Baby! It's Christmas" Released: November 11, 2014; 2. "This Christmas" Released: November 13, 2015; 3. "Baby, It's Cold Outside" Released: November 18, 2016

This Christmas is the third release overall but second extended play by American country music singer Jessie James Decker. Released on December 4, 2015, the album was released through Big Yellow Dog Music. The EP includes the original song, "Baby! It's Christmas", released as a promotional single in November 2014. Two other songs have been issues as singles: the title track, in November 2015, and the version of "Baby, It's Cold Outside" featuring Decker's husband, Eric Decker, released in November 2016.

Critic Darryl Sterdan rated the album 2-1/2 stars out of 4, and called it "a surprisingly swell little treat".

== Track listing ==
No.	Title	Length
1.	"Baby! It's Christmas"	3:22
2.	"This Christmas"	3:32
3.	"Baby, It's Cold Outside" (featuring Joe Nichols)	2:46
4.	"My Santa Claus"	2:55
5.	"All I Want for Christmas Is You"	3:52
6.	"Have Yourself a Merry Little Christmas"	4:19
7.	"Baby, It's Cold Outside" (featuring Eric Decker)	2:46
Total length:		23:32

== Chart performance ==
This Christmas sold 5,600 copies in its first week of release.

Chart (2015)	Peak position
US Billboard 200	178
US Top Country Albums (Billboard)	16
US Top Holiday Albums (Billboard)	42
US Independent Albums (Billboard)	7
