= Wanted (Jessie James song) =

Single by Jessie James

from the album Jessie James
- Released: April 14, 2009
- Genre: Dance-rock
- Length: 3:05
- Label: Mercury, Island Def Jam
- Songwriter(s): Jessie James, Kara DioGuardi, Mitch Allan, David Hodges
- Producer(s): Mitch Allan

Jessie James singles chronology
"Wanted" (2009)	"I Look So Good (Without You)" (2009)

"Wanted" is the debut single released by American country-pop singer-songwriter Jessie James, taken from her self-titled debut album (2009). It was first released to American contemporary hit radio through Mercury Records on April 14, 2009, as the album's lead single and was later released to digital retailers on May 12.

Upon release, "Wanted" was generally well received by contemporary music critics, who praised James's "powerful" voice and the song's pop radio appeal. The song entered the top 40 on the Billboard Hot 100 and was certified Gold by the RIAA in 2010; it also charted on the Billboard Canadian Hot 100 at 82.

== Composition ==
"Wanted" is an upbeat dance-rock song with a duration of three minutes and five seconds (3:05). The song also draws influences from pop rock in its production and country pop from James's "slight Southern twang." It was written by Jessie James, Kara DioGuardi, Mitch Allan, and David Hodges, and was produced by Allan. According to the digital sheet music published by EMI Music Publishing, the song was originally composed in the key of G major with a vocal range of G_{3}–D_{5} and a moderate pop rock tempo of approximately 110 BPM. James' vocal style on the song has been compared to Christina Aguilera.

The song's lyrics describe a woman attracting the attention of a potential lover, but on her own terms, with James declaring "I only want to be wanted by you." It has been described as a message of female empowerment and praised for portraying James as being in control of the situation.

== Critical reception ==
In a review for the song, Michael Menachem of Billboard said that James had "what it takes to make a name for herself." He described the song as "alluring" and "forceful." An uncredited editorial review of the album on Amazon Music described "Wanted" as a catchy, "full-throttle dance-rock scorcher." Rudy K. of Sputnikmusic complimented James on producing a "fantastic pop single" and praised the song's structure for building up to the chorus. Writing for Slant Magazine, Jonathan Keefe similarly applauded the song's dynamics for showcasing James's "powerful voice."

== Commercial reception ==
"Wanted" debuted at number 87 on the Billboard Hot 100 for the week of May 30, 2009. It fell off the chart for four weeks before re-entering at No. 98 on June 27, 2009. It continued to rise and eventually reached a peak position of 40 for the chart dated August 29, 2009. "Wanted" also peaked at number four on the Heatseekers Songs chart before entering the top 50 on the Hot 100 and becoming ineligible. The song charted at number 23 and number 34 on the Pop Songs and Adult Pop Songs radio airplay charts, respectively, and also reaching 18 on the Hot Dance Club Songs chart tracking airplay in American dance clubs. The song has sold 336,750 digital copies as of August 20, 2009. On December 8, 2010, "Wanted" was certified Gold by the RIAA, indicating sales of over 500,000.

== Music video ==
The music video of "Wanted" was shot in Los Angeles. Actor Erik Von Detten makes a cameo in the video as a police officer that chases after Jessie through a series of events and eventually "captures" her in a diner before leading her to his vehicle where they proceed to kiss. The music video was directed by Travis Kopach and premiered April 27, 2009, on VH1.

== Tracklist ==
The Remixes

1. "Wanted" (Wideboys Full Club) - 7:27
2. "Wanted" (Wideboys Dub) - 7:16
3. "Wanted" (Jason Nevins Extended) - 6:08
4. "Wanted" (Jason Phats Vocal Mix) - 8:19
5. "Wanted" (Jason Phats Bootleg Vocal Mix) - 7:41
6. "Wanted" (Jason Phats Dub Mix) - 8:36

== Charts and certifications ==
=== Weekly charts ===
Chart (2009)	Peak position
Canada (Canadian Hot 100)	82
Canada CHR/Top 40 (Billboard)	45
US Billboard Hot 100	40
US Adult Pop Airplay (Billboard)	34
US Dance Club Songs (Billboard)	18
US Pop Airplay (Billboard)	23

=== Certifications ===
Region	Certification	Certified units/sales
United States (RIAA)	Gold	500,000^{*}
^{*} Sales figures based on certification alone.

== Release history ==
Country	Date	Format	Label(s)	Ref.
United States	April 14, 2009	Contemporary hit radio	Mercury Records; Island Def Jam Music Group	
Australia	April 27, 2009	Radio airplay		
United States	May 12, 2009	Digital download	Mercury Records	
United States	May 26, 2009	Hot adult contemporary	Mercury Records; Island Def Jam Music Group	
