= Jessie James (album) =

Studio album by Jessie James
- Released: August 10, 2009
- Recorded: 2008–2009
- Genre: Country, pop
- Length: 42:45
- Label: Mercury, Def Jam
- Producer: Julian Bunetta, Rodney "Darkchild" Jerkins, Mitch Allan, David Hodges, John Rich, Mick Schultz, John Fields, Ted Bruner, Trey Vittetoe

Jessie James chronology
Jessie James (2009)	Comin' Home (2014)

Singles from Jessie James
- 1. "Wanted" Released: April 14, 2009; 2. "I Look So Good (Without You)" Released: August 25, 2009; 3. "My Cowboy" Released: November 10, 2009

Jessie James is the debut album by the American country-pop singer-songwriter Jessie James. The album was released digitally on August 10, 2009, and physically on August 11 by Mercury Records and Def Jam Recordings. The album charted on the Billboard 200 at #23 on its debut week, selling about 18,575 copies.

The song "Wanted" was the album's lead single on April 14, 2009, and peaked at No. 40 on the Billboard Hot 100. The second single "I Look So Good (Without You)" was released on August 25, 2009, and peaked at No. 4 on the Billboard Bubbling Under Hot 100 chart. The third single "My Cowboy" was released on November 10, 2009.

The song "Blue Jeans" was featured on the soundtrack of the film Confessions of a Shopaholic.

== Critical reception ==
Professional ratings
Review scores
Source	Rating
AllMusic	3.5/5 stars
Entertainment Weekly	B+
Slant	2/5 stars
Sputnikmusic	2/5 stars

The album received positive reviews according to Metacritic, scoring 73 out of 100. Michael Menachem of Billboard with regard to the many genres present on the album said that James had "a voice that seems to work with many genres". Stephen Thomas Erlewine of AllMusic thought the album was "inspired, original pop" but said it came short of being actual country music." Mikael Wood Entertainment Weekly said that "James falter[ed] on a handful of snoozy power ballads but play[ed] one heck of a small town kitten on up-tempo number."

== Track listing ==
No.	Title	Writer(s)	Length
1.	"Wanted"	Jessica James, Mitch Allan, Kara DioGuardi, David Hodges	3:05
2.	"Bullet"	James, Katy Perry, Ted Bruner, T. Vittetoe	3:16
3.	"I Look So Good (Without You)"	James, Rodney Jerkins, Savan Kotecha	3:52
4.	"Burnin’ Bridges"	Julian Bunetta	3:27
5.	"Blue Jeans"	James, Bunetta	3:55
6.	"My Cowboy"	James, Randy Houser, Jamey Johnson	3:12
7.	"Big Mouth"	James, Bunetta, Andrew Frampton	3:21
8.	"Burn It Up"	James, Bunetta, Kotecha	3:53
9.	"Psycho Girlfriend"	James, Bunetta	3:24
10.	"Inevitable"	James, Toby Gad	3:40
11.	"Girl Next Door"	Perry, Bruner, Vittetoe	3:22
12.	"Guilty"	James, Josh Kear, Mark Irwin	4:16

== Personnel ==
- Mitch Allan - bass, engineer, guitar, producer, programming
- Brian Barnett - drums
- Julian Bunetta - bass, clapping, drums, engineer, footsteps, instrumentation, keyboards, mixing, producer, string arrangements, vocal producer
- Ken Chastain - percussion, programming
- Dorian Crozier - drums
- Kara DioGuardi - vocals (background)
- John Fields - bass, engineer, guitar, keyboards, mixing, producer, programming
- Andrew Frampton - keyboards
- Serban Ghenea - mixing
- Mark Goldenberg - guitar
- Tina Guo - cello
- David Hodges - engineer, piano, producer, programming
- Jessie James and the Odd Balls- clapping, footsteps, vocals
- Mike Johnson - pedal steel
- Stephen Lu - keyboards, programming
- Tony Mardini - engineer
- David & Phil Massey - A&R
- Peter Mokran - mixing
- John D. Norten - engineer
- Carlos Oyanedel - mixing assistant
- David Paich - keyboards
- Brent Paschke - guitar
- Katy Perry - vocals (background)
- Eric Peterson - guitar, mixing
- Brian Ray - guitar, guitar (acoustic), slide guitar
- Tim Roberts - mixing assistant
- Mick Schultz - producer
- Adam Shoenfeld - guitar (electric)
- Mark Smidt - horn
- Phil Tan - mixing
- Trey Vittetoe - engineer, mixing, performer, producer
- Billy Watts - guitar
- Glenn Worf - bass
- Jonathan Yudkin - fiddle

== Chart performance ==
Chart (2009)	Peak position
U.S. Billboard 200	23
