= Eric & Jessie: Game On =

American reality television series

- Cast of Eric & Jessie: Game On
- Genre: Reality television
- Starring: Eric Decker; Jessie James Decker
- Country of origin: United States
- Original language: English
- No. of seasons: 3
- No. of episodes: 20

Production
- Executive producer: Jessie James Decker
- Running time: 22 minutes
- Production company: Shedmedia US

Original release
- Network: E!
- Release: September 29, 2013 – October 25, 2017

Eric & Jessie: Game On is an American reality television series starring Eric Decker and Jessie James Decker. The series premiered on September 29, 2013, on E!. E! announced on June 28, 2017 the show would be returning for a third season that premiered on September 6, 2017 at 10pm.

== Episodes ==
=== Series overview ===
Season	Episodes	Originally released	
Season	Episodes	First released	Last released
1	6	September 29, 2013	November 6, 2013
2	6	March 30, 2014	May 4, 2014
3	8	September 6, 2017	October 25, 2017

=== Season 1 (2013) ===
No. overall	No. in season	Title	Original release date	US viewers (millions)
1	1	"Home Sweet Denver"	September 29, 2013	N/A
2	2	"Whoa Baby!"	October 6, 2013	N/A
3	3	"Double Date Disaster"	October 13, 2013	N/A
4	4	"Fling Before the Ring"	October 20, 2013	N/A
5	5	"Mr. and Mrs. Decker"	November 3, 2013	N/A
6	6	"Boudoir Bride"	November 6, 2013	N/A

=== Season 2 (2014) ===
No. overall	No. in season	Title	Original release date	US viewers (millions)
7	1	"Triple Decker"	March 30, 2014	N/A
8	2	"Shower Me With Germs"	April 6, 2014	N/A
9	3	"We're Going to the Super Bowl!"	April 13, 2014	N/A
10	4	"Back in Action"	April 20, 2014	N/A
11	5	"Contracts and Contractions"	April 27, 2014	N/A
12	6	"Oh Baby!"	May 4, 2014	N/A

=== Season 3 (2017) ===
No. overall	No. in season	Title	Original release date	US viewers (millions)
13	1	"Home Sweet Decker 3"	September 6, 2017	.543
14	2	"What Happens In Vegas"	September 13, 2017	.513
15	3	"Southern Charm"	September 20, 2017	.322
16	4	"Girls Night Out"	September 27, 2017	.345
17	5	"Master Pranksters"	October 4, 2017	.333
18	6	"Home Is Where The Heart Is"	October 11, 2017	.372
19	7	"Christmas In July"	October 18, 2017	.295
20	8	"There's No Place Like Home"	October 25, 2017	N/A
