= Knowsley Hall Music Festival =

Music Festival

- Genre: Rock.
- Dates: Last Weekend of June (2 days)
- Locations: Knowsley Hall, Merseyside, England, United Kingdom
- Years active: 2007 – Present
- Founders: James Barton (Cream), Lord Edward Stanley

Knowsley Hall Music Festival is a music festival based at Knowsley Hall in Merseyside, near Liverpool. It is commonly abbreviated to 'KHMF' or 'Knowsley'. It was created by the CEO of Cream and Creamfields, James Barton, and Lord Edward Stanley the Lord of the Manor for Knowsley Hall. The first festival was in 2007 and the headline acts were The Who and Keane.

== Beginnings ==
James Barton of Cream wanted to create a rock music festival in the North West to rival that of the other great festivals across Britain after the success of his Creamfields dance music festival. The event was co-produced by Cream and festival management firm Loud Sound, which already organises Creamfields, the Isle of Wight’s Bestival and RockNess in Scotland. Barton approached Lord Derby to use the grounds of Knowsley Hall as it was an ideal venue for an atmospheric festival he said. Lord Derby was more than happy to take part in the organising of the first ever KHMF, after the success of a Status Quo concert there the previous year. With Barton's contacts and experience and with Lord Derby's estate, the north west was set to have the biggest festival ever to take place there. The Who, The Coral, The View, and Keane were the first acts to be signed up, The Zutons then followed. Many more acts followed, with Joss Stone and special guests: Madness, being added to the Sunday event due to minor complaints of not enough acts being announced for the Sunday early on. The many other acts were announced various weeks later during the build-up to the festival.

== 2007 ==
=== Lineup ===
	Main Stage	MySpace Stage
Saturday 23 June 2007	The Who; The Coral; The View; The Thrills; Shack; Pete Wylie & The Mighty Wah!; The Rascals; State Warning; The Idol Minds	The Black Velvets; The Loungs; The Alones; The Maybes?; Miss King & The Kougars; The Quarter; Delta Fiasco; The Pedantics
Sunday 24 June 2007	Keane; The Zutons; Madness; Joss Stone; The Icicle Works; Ross Copperman; The Wombats; The Hoosiers; The Orange Lights; State Warning	The Aeroplanes; I Am Finn; Shady Bard; Laura Critchley; Jamie Scott & The Town; Cracatilla; Sourmash; The Johnsons; dBd
