= Kelly Emberg =

American former model

- Born: July 2, 1959 (age 67); Houston, Texas, U.S.
- Occupations: Model, Actress, Interior Designer, Lifestyle Journalist, Activewear Brand Owner
- Spouses: Brad Jenkel (divorced) Mike Padilla (m. 2007)
- Partners: Rod Stewart (1983–1990); Eric Babin
- Children: 3, including Ruby Stewart
- Modeling information
- Height: 5 ft 8 (172.7 cm)
- Hair color: blonde
- Eye color: blue

Kelly Kay Emberg (born July 2, 1959) is an American former model who appeared in the Sports Illustrated Swimsuit Issue, on the cover of Vogue, Harper’s Bazaar, Glamour, Mademoiselle, Cosmopolitan, Self magazines, and in advertisements for Cover Girl, Maybelline, Loreal, Napier Jewelry, and Calvin Klein.

== Early life ==
Kelly Kay Emberg was born in Houston, Texas to Ron and Kay Emberg, and has two siblings. She competed in gymnastics until attending Stratford High School, where she joined the drill team and became a cheerleader her senior year. During her senior year in high school, Emberg began her career in modeling. Emberg worked as a professional model from 1978 through the 1990s. She was featured on fashion magazine covers in the USA and throughout Europe, in addition to appearing five times in the famed Sports Illustrated Swimsuit Edition from 1981 to 1989.

== Career ==
Emberg began a career in modeling part-time during high school. After being "discovered" by Alan Martin, a local photographer in Houston she was introduced to John Casablancas. Casablancas brought her to New York City to join his new agency Elite Model Management, where her print career took off. She appeared on the covers of Vogue, Harper's Bazaar, Glamour and Cosmopolitan magazines. Her first cover was for British Vogue photographed by Alex Chatelain. She also appeared numerous times in the Sports Illustrated Swimsuit Issue and in advertisements for Cover Girl cosmetics, Napier Jewelry, and Calvin Klein.

After her modeling career, Emberg attended UCLA for three years studying interior design. She worked for interior designer Michael S. Smith and owned The Cotton Box, a design shop on Melrose Avenue in Los Angeles, CA. Her biggest client is Rod Stewart. Emberg created the interior designs for the guest house on his Los Angeles estate in which Ruby, along with Kimberly and Sean, Stewart's children by Alana Hamilton all live.

Emberg's interest in gardening led to her career as Kelly Emberg: The Model Gardener, in which she provides advice and encourages people to grow their own organic vegetables.

In 2020, with the onset of the COVID-19 pandemic and the temporary closure of fitness clubs, Emberg started playing pickleball. Through her passion for the emerging sport, Emberg created a women’s sportswear line called BESO Shade. The product is manufactured in the USA using UPF 50+ materials to protect skin from the damaging effects from the sun.

== Personal life ==
Emberg began dating singer Rod Stewart in 1983. The couple had one child, a daughter, Ruby, born June 7, 1987, in Los Angeles. The couple split in the summer of 1990. Stewart insisted it was Emberg's decision to break off the relationship. He later mentioned in his autobiography the reason for the breakup was due to his continued unfaithfulness and he also met future wife Rachel Hunter. Emberg filed a palimony suit in early 1991, which was settled in 1993 for an undisclosed amount.

In 1990, Emberg attended the UCLA Interior and Environmental Design School and in 1993 became a design assistant for famed interior designer Michael Smith. By 1994 Emberg started her own interior design company, Kelly Emberg Designs. Her clientele included Julianna Margulies, Patricia Arquette, Pam Dawber and Mark Harmon, Entertainment Managers, and her ex-boyfriend Rod Stewart.

In 1995, Emberg met film producer Brad Jenkel and the couple married in 1997. In June 1998, she gave birth to their son, Tyler Edward Jenkel. Emberg and Jenkel split in 2000. A year later Emberg had her third child, Cole Riley Emberg/Brodin in 2001.

Emberg met Michael Dario Padilla in 2005 and they married in 2007. The family moved to San Diego, CA where she took an interest in horticulture to grow fruits and vegetables for the family. This passion led to Emberg creating a podcast for IHeart Radio 2013 called “FOOD MADE SIMPLE”. Since 2015, she has authored growing articles for Westlake Malibu Lifestyle Magazine and Genlux Magazine. Concurrently Emberg developed the identity and the blog site "The Model Gardener" where she writes and publishes home gardening tips.
