= Eric Decker =

American football player (born 1987)

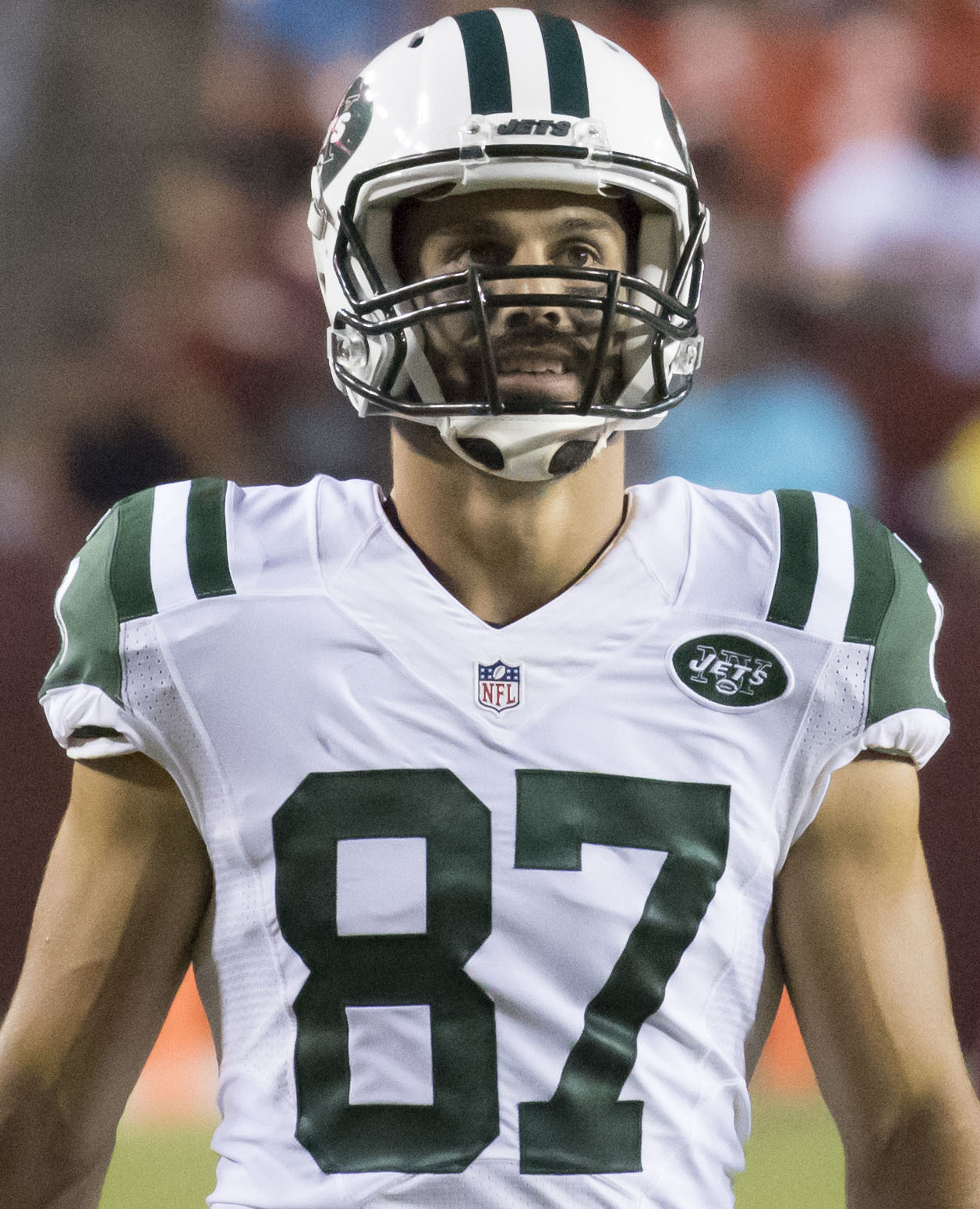
- Decker with the New York Jets in 2016

No. 81, 87
- Position: Wide receiver

Personal information
- Born: March 15, 1987 (age 39); Cold Spring, Minnesota, U.S.
- Listed height: 6 ft 3 in (1.91 m)
- Listed weight: 214 lb (97 kg)

Career information
- High school: Rocori (Cold Spring)
- College: Minnesota (2005–2009)
- NFL draft: 2010: 3rd round, 87th overall pick

Career history
- Denver Broncos (2010–2013); New York Jets (2014–2016); Tennessee Titans (2017); New England Patriots (2018)*
- * Offseason or practice squad member only

Awards and highlights
- 2× First-team All-Big Ten (2008, 2009)

Career NFL statistics
- Receptions: 439
- Receiving yards: 5,816
- Return yards: 796
- Total touchdowns: 54
- Stats at Pro Football Reference

Eric Thomas Decker (born March 15, 1987) is an American former professional football player who was a wide receiver for eight seasons in the National Football League (NFL). He played college football and college baseball for the Minnesota Golden Gophers, and was selected by the Denver Broncos in the third round of the 2010 NFL draft. After four seasons with the Broncos, Decker played for the New York Jets for three years, then the Tennessee Titans for one season.

== Early life ==
Decker attended Rocori High School in Cold Spring, Minnesota. He was present in school when a shooting took place there; he hid in a cupboard with other students until police officers rescued them. Decker was a three-sport athlete in football, basketball, and baseball. He was awarded all-conference, all-area, and all-section honors in each sport. Additionally, Decker was named the football team MVP two years in a row. He had 2,156 receiving yards and 28 touchdowns during his prep football career.

== College career ==
Decker attended the University of Minnesota. He made his collegiate debut against Kent State and had a single reception for a 39-yard touchdown from quarterback Bryan Cupito. On September 23, in a game at Purdue, he completed a 22-yard pass. As a freshman, Decker finished with 378 receiving yards and three touchdowns.

As a sophomore, Decker's role with the offense expanded. After recorded four receptions for 49 receiving yards in a season-opening loss to Bowling Green, he had seven receptions for 128 receiving yards and two receiving touchdowns against Miami (OH). In the following game, he had 12 receptions for 165 receiving yards and one receiving touchdown in a loss to FAU. On October 20, he threw a 20-yard touchdown pass to Ralph Spry in a loss to North Dakota State. He finished with 909 receiving yards and nine touchdowns. In a season where the Golden Gophers finished with a 1–11 record, Decker led the team in receptions and receiving yards, and tie for the lead in receiving touchdowns with Ernie Wheelwright.

Decker started his junior season with 10 receptions for 89 receiving yards and a touchdown against Northern Illinois. In the following game against Bowling Green, he had six receptions for 86 receiving yards and one receiving touchdown to go along with a 12-yard touchdown rush. In next week's game against Montana State, he had nine receptions for 157 receiving yards and one receiving touchdown. In the following game, he had seven receptions for 122 receiving yards and one receiving touchdown against FAU to cap a 4–0 start for the Golden Gophers. After the following week's game against Ohio State where Minnesota suffered their first setback of the season, Decker had 13 receptions for 190 receiving yards against Indiana. Minnesota qualified for the Insight Bowl against Kansas, where Decker recorded eight receptions for 149 receiving yards and a receiving touchdown in the 42–21 loss. Decker finished his junior season in 2008 with 84 catches for 1,074 yards and seven touchdowns. He led the 7–6 Golden Gophers in receptions, receiving yards, and receiving touchdowns.

In early spring 2009, Decker met with Thomas Goudy, a wide-out coach in St. Louis, Missouri. Goudy helped Decker with his ball-holding technique. Decker spent three weeks in his training camp before starting the summer conditioning camp. Decker began the season with the consistent play that had been a hallmark of his Gophers' career. Through three games, Decker was sixth in the nation in receiving yards, with 183 yards against Syracuse, 113 yards against Air Force, and 119 yards and two touchdowns against California. Sports Illustrated columnist Stewart Mandel declared Decker the third-best wide receiver in college football, behind Oklahoma State's Dez Bryant and Georgia's A. J. Green. After the California game, Decker had eight receptions for 84 yards and two receiving touchdowns against Northwestern, and in the following game, had eight receptions for 140 yards and a touchdown against Wisconsin. On October 27, 2009, it was announced that Decker would miss the rest of the season after suffering a sprained foot against Ohio State. As a senior, Decker finished with 758 receiving yards and five touchdowns.

Decker played outfield for the Minnesota baseball team. He was selected in the 39th round of the 2008 Major League Baseball draft by the Milwaukee Brewers and the 27th round of the 2009 Major League Baseball draft by the Minnesota Twins.

== Professional career ==
=== Pre-draft ===
Decker's senior season was cut short due to surgery he underwent to repair torn ligaments in his left foot. As a result, he was unable to participate in both the NFL Combine and Minnesota's pro day workout. He scored a 43 on the Wonderlic test at the combine, the top score for the group of prospects who took the test in Indianapolis.

Pre-draft measurables
Height	Weight	Arm length	Hand span	40-yard dash	Bench press	Wonderlic
6 ft 3 1/8 in (1.91 m)	217 lb (98 kg)	31 in (0.79 m)	9 1/8 in (0.23 m)	4.54 s	15 reps	43
All values from NFL Combine

=== Denver Broncos ===
==== 2010 season ====
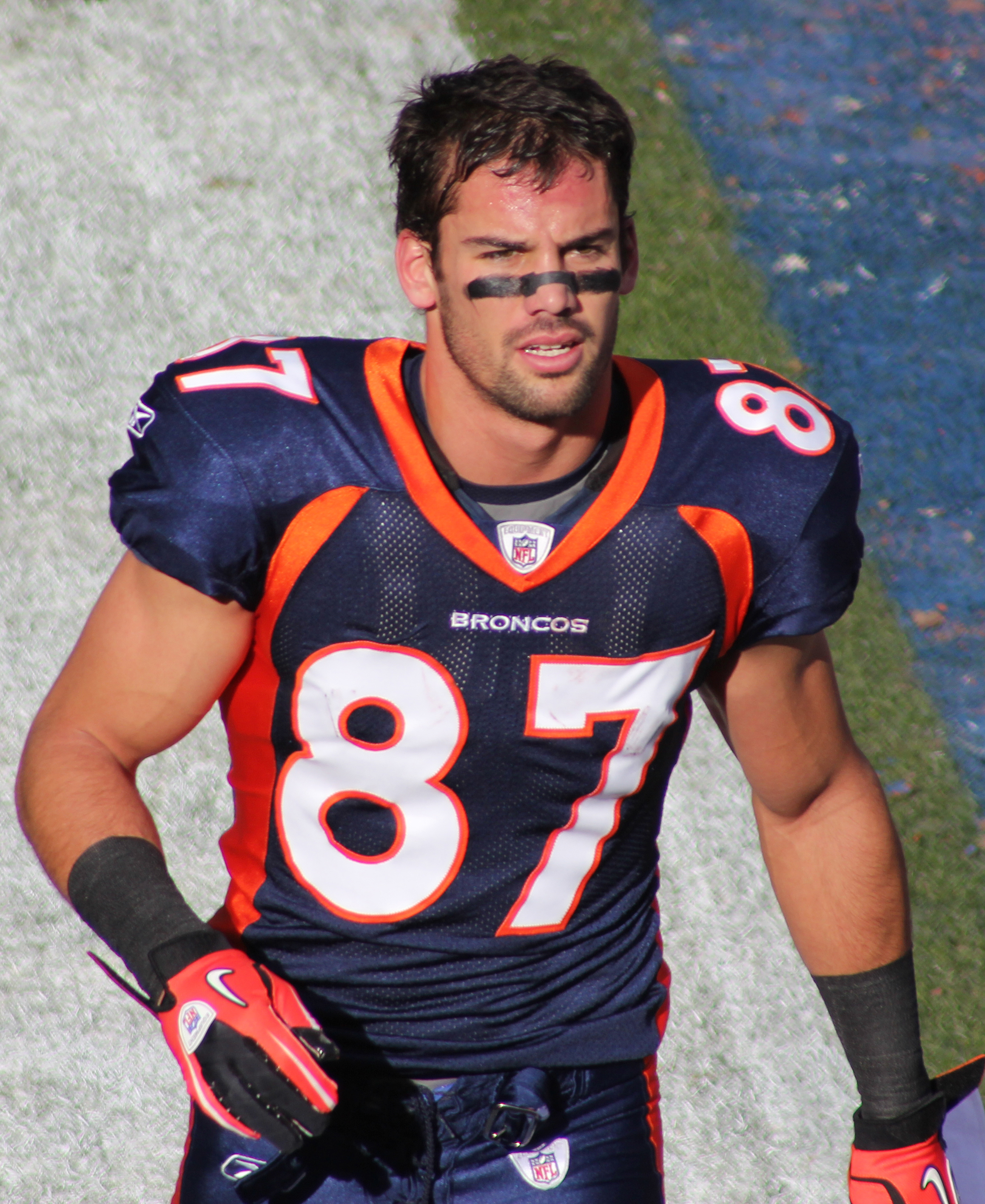
Decker in 2010

Decker was selected by the Denver Broncos in the third round with the 87th overall pick in the 2010 NFL draft. He signed a four-year contract through 2013 worth $2,522,000. Due to foot surgery, Decker sat out during Broncos rookie mini-camp and OTAs. Broncos head coach Josh McDaniels said he hoped he'd be ready by the season's opener, "At this point we're going to err on the side of being real careful and not put them in a situation where (it's) the last day of minicamp on June 13th and all of a sudden we have a foot injury," said McDaniels. "Hopefully, everybody will be ready by August."

On July 27, 2010, the Broncos signed Decker to a four-year contract. In the preseason, Decker led all NFL rookies in receptions, but due to the Broncos' depth at receiver, Decker did not see much action in the offense until late in the regular season. He did contribute on special teams, however, recording seven special teams tackles while returning 17 kickoffs for 429 yards giving him 25.2 yards per return average.

Toward the end of the season, the Broncos started to mix Decker into the offense more, after fellow rookie Demaryius Thomas went down with an injury. Decker finished his rookie season with six receptions for 106 yards and a touchdown.

==== 2011 season ====
Decker's role in Denver's offense expanded in 2011. During a Week 1 Monday Night Football matchup at home against the Oakland Raiders, Decker returned a fourth quarter punt for a 90-yard touchdown, but the Broncos lost 23–20. In Week 2, making his first professional start, Decker caught five passes for 113 yards and two touchdowns, the second on a 52-yard catch in the fourth quarter as Denver recorded their first win of the 2011 season, 24–22 over the Cincinnati Bengals. On September 25, in Denver's Week 3 17–14 loss to the Tennessee Titans, Decker had a career-high seven catches for 48 yards. Over the next four weeks, Decker continued his steady play by hauling in 18 passes for 192 yards and four touchdowns. On November 13, in a Week 10 divisional road game at Arrowhead Stadium against the division-rival Kansas City Chiefs, starting quarterback Tim Tebow attempted a pair of deep passes for Decker, the first almost being hauled in off a deflection and the other being knocked down by the defender, but in the fourth quarter, with Denver hanging on to a slim 10–7 lead, Tebow hit Decker on a go route deep for a 56-yard touchdown catch, Decker's only catch of the game and only Tebow's second completion, as the Broncos won 17–10 to move into a second-place tie in the AFC West with the San Diego Chargers and Chiefs. In the first round of the playoffs against the Pittsburgh Steelers, Decker was taken out of the game due to injury.

Decker finished the 2011 season with 44 receptions for 612 yards and eight touchdowns.

==== 2012 season ====
Heading into the 2012 regular season, Decker seemed primed to have a productive year with veteran quarterback Peyton Manning running Denver's offense. On May 12, Broncos' offensive coordinator Mike McCoy noted that Decker and fellow receiver Demaryius Thomas were "like two little kids in a candy shop right now", when asked about the receivers eagerness to work with Manning. In April, Decker attended a Colorado Rockies' baseball game with Manning and began workouts with him prior to training camp.

Decker had a breakout season in 2012. In Week 3 against the Houston Texans, he had eight receptions for 136 yards. From Week 4 to Week 9, he recorded seven receiving touchdowns over a span of five games. In Week 15 against the Baltimore Ravens, he finished with eight receptions for 133 yards and a touchdown. In Weeks 16–17, he recorded back-to-back games with two receiving touchdowns against the Cleveland Browns and Kansas City Chiefs. Decker finished the 2012 season with 85 catches for 1,064 yards and 13 touchdowns. He finished ranked 20th in the league in terms of yards for wide receivers and the 13 touchdowns was the second most among wide receivers in 2012. In the Broncos' Divisional Round game against the Baltimore Ravens, he had six receptions for 84 receiving yards in the 38–35 2OT loss.

==== 2013 season ====
In the 2013 season, Decker contributed to Peyton Manning's historical passing season. In Week 3, against the Oakland Raiders, Decker finished with eight receptions for 133 yards and a touchdown. In Week 7, against the Indianapolis Colts, he finished with eight receptions for 150 yards and a touchdown. In Week 13, Decker had a career day against the Kansas City Chiefs with eight catches for 174 yards and team record tying four touchdowns, earning him the AFC Offensive Player of the Week award. He followed up that performance with eight receptions for 117 yards and a touchdown against the Tennessee Titans. In Week 16, against the Houston Texans, he finished with 10 receptions for 131 yards and two touchdowns. Overall, Decker finished the 2013 season with 87 receptions for 1,288 yards, both career highs, and 11 touchdowns. In the Divisional Round, against the San Diego Chargers, he had two receptions for 32 yards in the 24–17 victory, while also returning a punt for 47 yards before tripping over his own feet and preventing a touchdown return. In the AFC Championship against the New England Patriots, he had five receptions for 73 yards in the 26–16 victory. The Broncos reached Super Bowl XLVIII, but lost 43–8 to the Seattle Seahawks. Decker was held to one reception for six yards in the Super Bowl due to tight coverage by the Seahawks' defensive backs.

=== New York Jets ===
==== 2014 season ====
On March 12, 2014, Decker signed a five-year, $36.25 million contract with the New York Jets. In his Jets' debut, he had five receptions for 74 yards in the 19–14 victory over the Oakland Raiders. In Week 17, Decker was targeted 11 times in the season-finale 37–24 victory against the Miami Dolphins and came up with a tying career-high 10 receptions for a career-high 221 yards and a touchdown. In Week 15, against the Tennessee Titans, he had seven receptions for 100 yards in the 16–11 victory. In the 2014 season, he had 74 receptions for 962 receiving yards scored and five receiving touchdowns.

==== 2015 season ====
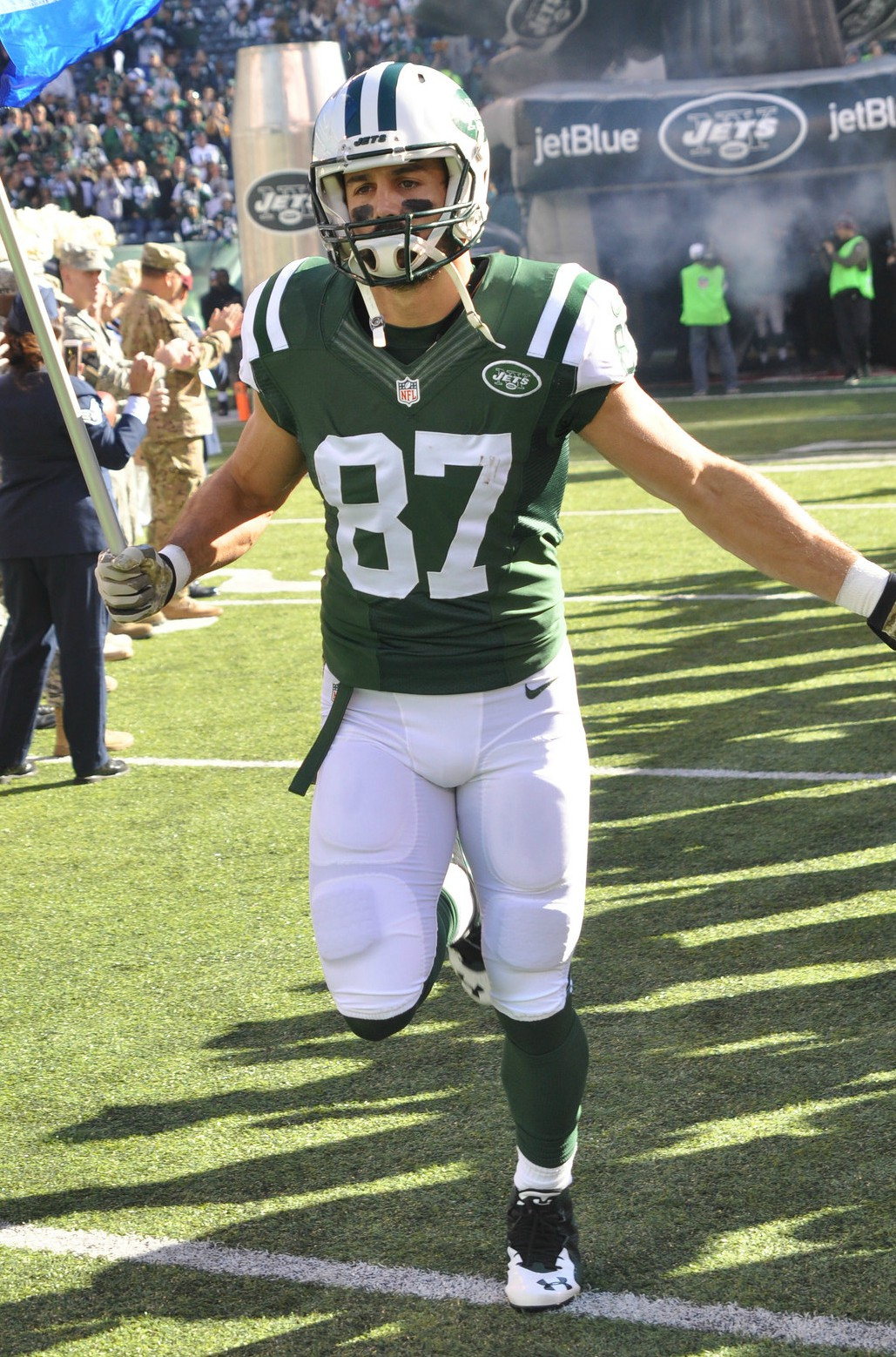
Decker in 2015

Decker started the season with a receiving touchdown in each of his first four games from Weeks 1–6. From Weeks 8–10, he had three straight games with a receiving touchdown. In Week 13, against the New York Giants, he had season-highs with eight receptions for 101 receiving yards in the 23–20 victory. From Weeks 14–17, he had four straight games with a receiving touchdown. In his most productive season with the Jets, Decker caught 80 passes for 1,027 yards and 12 touchdowns.

==== 2016 season ====
On September 16, Decker was fined $9,115 for a late hit he made on cornerback Josh Shaw on opening day against the Cincinnati Bengals. On October 12, the Jets placed Decker on injured reserve due to a shoulder injury. In three games in the 2016 season, he finished with nine receptions for 194 yards and two touchdowns.

On June 6, 2017, the Jets informed Decker that he would be either traded or released by the end of that week, effectively cutting ties with him. On June 12, 2017, Decker was officially released by the Jets.

=== Tennessee Titans ===
On June 18, 2017, Decker signed a one-year contract worth $3.85 million with the Tennessee Titans.

In the season opener against the Oakland Raiders, Decker had three receptions for 10 yards in his Titans debut. The Titans lost by a score of 26–16. During Week 2, he had three receptions for 32 yards, a kickoff return for 22 yards, and recovered an onside kick in a 37–16 road victory over the Jacksonville Jaguars. During Week 9, Decker caught his only touchdown of the regular season on an 11-yard pass from Marcus Mariota in a 23–20 victory over the Baltimore Ravens.

Decker finished the 2017 season with 54 receptions for 563 yards and a touchdown.

In the postseason, Decker caught the game-winning touchdown from Mariota in the Wild Card Round against the Kansas City Chiefs to win on the road 22–21. In the Divisional Round against the New England Patriots, he finished with six receptions for 85 yards in the 35–14 road loss.

=== New England Patriots ===
On August 2, 2018, Decker signed a one-year deal with the New England Patriots. With the move, Decker reunited with Josh McDaniels, the Patriots offensive coordinator and former head coach of the Denver Broncos.

=== Retirement ===
On August 26, 2018, Decker announced his retirement from the NFL.

== Career statistics ==
=== NFL ===
==== Regular season ====
Year	Team	Games		Receiving					Rushing					Returning					Fumbles	
Year	Team	GP	GS	Rec	Yds	Avg	Lng	TD	Att	Yds	Avg	Lng	TD	Ret	Yds	Avg	Lng	TD	Fum	Lost
2010	DEN	14	0	6	106	17.7	38	1	—	—	—	—	—	22	556	25.3	51	0	1	1
2011	DEN	16	13	44	612	13.9	56T	8	1	1	1.0	1	0	8	183	22.9	90T	1	1	1
2012	DEN	16	15	85	1,064	12.5	55	13	—	—	—	—	—	2	22	11.0	13	0	0	0
2013	DEN	16	16	87	1,288	14.8	61	11	—	—	—	—	—	1	2	2.0	2	0	2	1
2014	NYJ	15	15	74	962	13.0	74T	5	—	—	—	—	—	—	—	—	—	—	0	0
2015	NYJ	15	13	80	1,027	12.8	35	12	—	—	—	—	—	1	11	11.0	11	0	1	1
2016	NYJ	3	3	9	194	21.6	35	2	—	—	—	—	—	—	—	—	—	—	0	0
2017	TEN	16	8	54	563	10.4	29	1	—	—	—	—	—	1	22	22.0	22	0	0	0
Total		111	83	439	5,816	13.2	74T	53	1	1	1.0	1	0	35	796	22.7	90T	1	5	4

==== Postseason ====
Year	Team	Games		Receiving					Rushing					Returning					Fumbles	
Year	Team	GP	GS	Rec	Yds	Avg	Lng	TD	Att	Yds	Avg	Lng	TD	Ret	Yds	Avg	Lng	TD	Fum	Lost
2011	DEN	1	1	0	0	0.0	0	0	1	9	9.0	9	0	—	—	—	—	—	0	0
2012	DEN	1	1	6	84	14.0	32	0	—	—	—	—	—	—	—	—	—	—	0	0
2013	DEN	3	3	8	111	13.9	21	0	—	—	—	—	—	4	75	18.8	47	0	0	0
2017	TEN	2	1	8	106	13.3	22T	1	—	—	—	—	—	—	—	—	—	—	0	0
Total		7	6	22	301	13.7	32	1	1	9	9.0	9	0	4	75	18.8	47	0	0	0

=== College ===
Season	Team	GP	Receiving				Rushing			
Season	Team	GP	Rec	Yds	Avg	TD	Att	Yds	Avg	TD
2006	Minnesota	13	26	238	14.5	3	1	5	5.0	0
2007	Minnesota	12	67	909	13.6	9	3	22	7.3	0
2008	Minnesota	12	84	1,074	12.8	7	11	87	7.9	1
2009	Minnesota	8	50	758	15.2	5	0	0	0.0	0
Career		45	227	3,119	13.7	24	13	114	7.6	1

== Career highlights ==
=== Awards and honors ===
NFL

- AFC receiving touchdowns leader (2012)
- AFC champion (2013)
- AFC Offensive Player of the Week (Week 13, 2013)

College

- 2× First-team All-Big Ten (2008, 2009)

=== Broncos franchise records ===
- Most receiving touchdowns in a single game: 4 (December 1, 2013, at Kansas City)
- Most kick return yards in a single game: 211 (December 12, 2010, at Arizona)

== Personal life ==
On June 22, 2013, Decker married country singer Jessie James. They have four children: a daughter born in March 2014, a son born in September 2015, a second son born in March 2018 and a third son born in February 2024.

== Television ==
Decker and his wife starred in the E! reality show Eric & Jessie: Game On which ran from September 29, 2013, until 2017.
