= Avril Lavigne discography =

Cataloguing of published recordings by Avril Lavigne

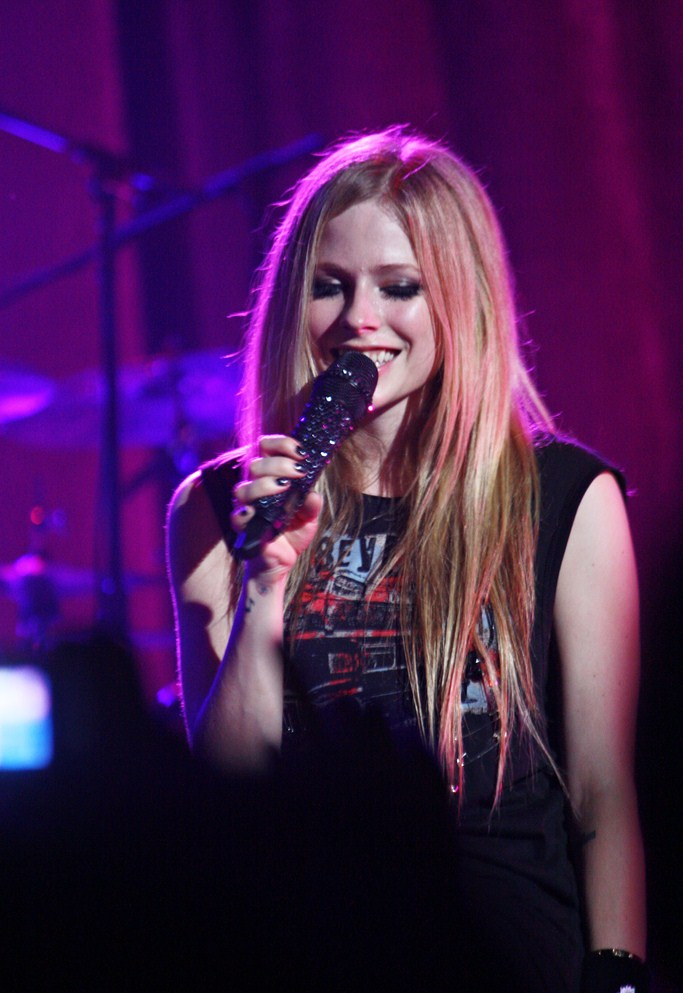
- Lavigne performing in concert (2011)
- Studio albums: 7
- Extended plays: 9
- Live albums: 1
- Singles: 37
- Music videos: 40
- Promotional singles: 14
- Charity singles: 5

Canadian singer-songwriter Avril Lavigne has released seven studio albums, nine extended plays (EPs), 37 singles, and 40 music videos, and she has appeared on several movie soundtracks and charity albums. With worldwide sales of 50 million albums and 50 million singles, Lavigne is ranked as the third top-selling Canadian female artist in history. Billboard listed her as the eighth best-selling Canadian artists of the Nielsen Music Canada era. According to Recording Industry Association of America, Lavigne has sold 28.07 million albums and singles in the United States.

Lavigne's debut studio album Let Go was released in June 2002 and peaked at number two on the US Billboard 200 in the United States. It has sold over 16 million copies worldwide and is certified seven-times platinum in the United States. The album's lead single, "Complicated", peaked at number one in Australia and Canada and at number two in the United States, and it sold 3 million units in the US. Its subsequent single releases, "Sk8er Boi" and "I'm with You", became worldwide top ten hits. Lavigne released her second studio album Under My Skin in May 2004, and debuted at number one in Australia, Mexico, Canada, Japan, the United Kingdom and the United States. The album went on to sell more than 10 million copies worldwide. "My Happy Ending", the second and most successful single from the album, peaked at number nine on the US Billboard Hot 100 and sold 1.2 million copies in the United States.

In April 2007, her third studio album, The Best Damn Thing, was released. It was her second album to debut at number one on the US Billboard 200 chart, it sold 6 million copies worldwide, and has produced Lavigne's most successful single, "Girlfriend". The song became her first number one hit on the US Billboard Hot 100 chart, and subsequently became her best-selling single in that region with 3.8 million copies sold. The song also peaked at number one on the other record charts of several nations, including Canada, Australia, New Zealand and Europe. "Girlfriend" became a worldwide best-selling single, with 7.5 million copies sold. The album's second single, "When You're Gone", was a top-forty hit in the United States, and it reached the top ten in Australia, Canada, Sweden, and the United Kingdom. In March 2011, Lavigne released her fourth studio album, Goodbye Lullaby, it had sold 1.5 million copies worldwide. It was preceded by its lead single, "What the Hell", which peaked at number 11 on the US Billboard Hot 100 chart and has sold 2.1 million copies in the United States. The album's second single, "Smile", was released in May 2011, and its third, "Wish You Were Here", was released later in September. In November 2013, Lavigne released her fifth studio album, Avril Lavigne. Its lead single, "Here's to Never Growing Up", had moderate success peaking inside the top 20 in Australia, Canada, Ireland, the United Kingdom, and the United States, selling 1.3 million copies in the United States. The album spawned four more singles: "Rock n Roll", "Let Me Go", "Hello Kitty" and "Give You What You Like". In February 2019, Lavigne released her sixth studio album Head Above Water and debuted at number 13 on the US Billboard 200, and number five on the Canadian Albums, and number 10 on the UK Albums (OCC). The lead single of the album, also titled "Head Above Water", was released in September 2018, and peaked at number 64 on the US Billboard Hot 100 and number 37 on the Canadian Hot 100 and certified RIAA Platinum with 1 million units sold in the United States. The album spawned three more singles: "Tell Me It's Over", "Dumb Blonde", and "I Fell in Love with the Devil".

In February 2022, Lavigne released her seventh studio album Love Sux. The album debuted at number nine on the US Billboard 200 chart, while it debuted at number three in Australia, Austria, Canada, and in the UK. Overall, Love Sux debuted on the top ten in eleven countries. The album's lead single "Bite Me", was released in November 2021, it had moderate success debuting at number 63 in Canada, and 61 in the UK, and number 20 on the US Billboard Bubbling Under Hot 100 Singles chart, the song was certified Gold in Brazil and Canada. The album's second single "Love It When You Hate Me" featuring American singer Blackbear was released in January 2022, it debuted at number 76 in Canada, and it charted moderately on the US component charts, and made an impact on US radios. The third single, "Bois Lie" featuring American singer Machine Gun Kelly was released in September 2022, And It debuted at number 85 in Canada, the song charted moderately on the component charts in the US.

Lavigne has written songs for several film soundtracks, including those of American Wedding and Sweet Home Alabama. Two songs that she originally wrote for films were included on subsequent studio albums. "Keep Holding On", written for Eragon, appeared on The Best Damn Thing, and "Alice", written for Alice in Wonderland, appeared on Goodbye Lullaby. She also has 15 VEVO-certified videos, including "Girlfriend", "Smile", "Complicated", and "Hot".

== Albums ==
=== Studio albums ===
List of studio albums, with selected chart positions, sales figures and certifications
Title	Album details	Peak chart positions										Sales	Certifications
Title	Album details	CAN	AUS	AUT	GER	ITA	JPN	NZ	SWI	UK	US	Sales	Certifications
Let Go	Released: June 4, 2002; Label: Arista; Format: Cassette, CD, DataPlay, digital download, LP, streaming	1	1	2	2	6	6	1	2	1	2	World: 16,000,000 (Note: Worldwide sales figures for Let Go as of January 2011.); CAN: 1,000,000; AUS: ~ 500,000 (Note: Australia sales figures for Let Go as of August 2004.); JPN: 1,500,000 (Note: Japan sales figures for Let Go as of August 2003.); UK: 1,711,088 (Note: UK sales figures for Let Go as of November 2006.); US: 6,900,000 (Note: United States sales figures for Let Go as of September 2015.)	MC: Diamond; ARIA: 7× Platinum; BPI: 6× Platinum; BVMI: 3× Gold; FIMI: Gold; IFPI AUT: Platinum; IFPI SWI: 2× Platinum; RIAA: 7× Platinum; RIAJ: Million; RMNZ: 5× Platinum
Under My Skin	Released: May 21, 2004; Label: Arista; Format: Cassette, CD, digital download, LP, streaming	1	1	1	1	3	1	7	2	1	1	World: 10,000,000 (Note: Worldwide sales figures for Under My Skin as of January 2011.); JPN: 924,000 (Note: Japan sales figures for Under My Skin as of September 2004.); UK: 670,000 (Note: UK sales figures Under My Skin as of September 2019.); US: 3,200,000 (Note: United States sales figures for Under My Skin as of September 2015.)	MC: 5× Platinum; ARIA: Platinum; BPI: 2× Platinum; BVMI: Gold; IFPI AUT: Platinum; IFPI SWI: Platinum; RIAA: 3× Platinum; RIAJ: Million; RMNZ: Gold
The Best Damn Thing	Released: April 17, 2007; Label: RCA; Format: Cassette, CD, digital download, LP, streaming	1	2	1	1	1	1	2	2	1	1	World: 6,000,000 (Note: Worldwide sales figures for The Best Damn Thing as of January 2011.); JPN: 848,000 (Note: Japan sales figures for The Best Damn Thing as of September 2007.); UK: 452,672 (Note: United Kingdom sales figures for The Best Damn Thing as of March 2011.); US: 1,700,000 (Note: United States sales figures for The Best Damn Thing as of July 2013.)	MC: 4× Platinum; ARIA: 2× Platinum; BPI: Platinum; BVMI: Platinum; IFPI AUT: Platinum; IFPI SWI: Platinum; RIAA: 2× Platinum; RIAJ: Million; RMNZ: Platinum
Goodbye Lullaby	Released: March 2, 2011; Label: RCA; Format: CD, digital download, LP, streaming	2	1	3	4	5	2	7	2	9	4	World: 1,500,000 (Note: Worldwide sales figures for Goodbye Lullaby as of April 2013.); JPN: 530,000 (Note: Japan sales figures for Goodbye Lullaby as of November 2013.); US: 394,000 (Note: United States sales figures for Goodbye Lullaby as of September 2015.)	MC: Platinum; ARIA: Gold; BPI: Gold; FIMI: Gold; RIAA: Gold; RIAJ: Platinum; RMNZ: Gold
Avril Lavigne	Released: November 1, 2013; Label: Epic; Format: CD, digital download, LP, streaming	4	7	9	15	8	2	8	8	14	5	World: 650,000 (Note: Worldwide sales figures for Avril Lavigne as of December 2014.); US: 165,000 (Note: United States sales figures for Avril Lavigne as of September 2015.)	MC: Platinum; BPI: Silver; RIAA: Gold; RIAJ: Gold
Head Above Water	Released: February 15, 2019; Label: BMG; Format: CD, digital download, LP, streaming	5	9	2	3	6	7	21	4	10	13	JPN: 42,424 (Note: Japan sales figures for Head Above Water as of December 2019.)	
Love Sux	Released: February 25, 2022; Label: Elektra, DTA; Format: Cassette, CD, digital download, LP, streaming	3	3	3	6	22	7	19	7	3	9		

=== Live albums ===
List of live albums, with selected chart positions, sales figures and certifications
Title	Album details	Peak chart positions				Certifications (DVD)	Notes
Title	Album details	GER	ITA	POR	SWI	Certifications (DVD)	Notes
My World	Released: November 3, 2003; Label: Arista; Format: CD+DVD, digital download, DVD	46	69	23	84	MC: 7× Platinum; ARIA: Platinum; BPI: Gold; RIAJ: Gold	A CD/DVD set featuring her Try to Shut Me Up Tour at HSBC Arena in Buffalo, New York. The audio-only EP edition was individually released on iTunes Store on November 10, 2003.

=== Compilation albums ===
List of compilations, with selected chart positions
Title	Album details	Peak chart positions										Certifications
Title	Album details	CAN	AUS	AUT	GER	ITA	JPN	NZ	SWI	UK	US	Certifications
12" Masters: The Essential Mixes	Released: September 17, 2010; Label: Sony, RCA; Format: CD, digital download, streaming	—	—	—	—	74	33	—	—	—	—	
Greatest Hits	Released: June 21, 2024; Label: Legacy; Format: CD, 2×LP	59	61	11	21	64	7	34	47	33	76	BPI: Gold; RMNZ: Gold
"—" denotes a recording that did not chart or was not released in that territory.

== Extended plays ==
List of extended plays, with details
Title	Extended play details
The Angus Drive	Released: January 5, 2003; Label: Arista; Format: CD
Avril Lavigne: My World	Released: November 10, 2003; Label: Arista; Format: Digital download, streaming
Avril Live – Try to Shut Me Up	Released: July 15, 2003; Label: Arista; Format: Digital download, streaming
Avril Live Acoustic	Released: July 1, 2004; Label: Arista; Format: CD, digital download
Walmart Soundcheck	Released: January 30, 2007; Label: RCA; Format: Digital download, streaming
Nissan Live Sets on Yahoo! Music	Released: May 1, 2007; Label: RCA; Format: Digital download, streaming
MTV.com Live: Avril Lavigne	Released: March 25, 2008; Label: Arista; Format: Digital download, streaming
Control Room – Live EP	Released: May 14, 2008; Label: RCA; Format: Digital download, streaming
Spotify Singles	Released: June 24, 2022; Label: Elektra, DTA; Format: Streaming

== Singles ==
=== As lead artist ===
List of singles as lead artist, with selected chart positions, showing year released and album name
Title	Year	Peak chart positions										Sales	Certifications	Album
Title	Year	CAN	AUS	AUT	GER	ITA	JPN	NZ	SWI	UK	US	Sales	Certifications	Album
"Complicated"	2002	1	1	2	3	2	—	1	2	3	2	World: 6,000,000; UK: 663,000; US: 3,000,000	MC: 4× Platinum; ARIA: 2× Platinum; BPI: 3× Platinum; BVMI: Platinum; FIMI: Platinum; IFPI AUT: Gold; IFPI SWI: Gold; RIAA: 4× Platinum; RIAJ: Gold; RMNZ: 4× Platinum	Let Go
"Sk8er Boi"	2002	29	3	7	18	8	—	2	17	8	10	UK: 503,000; US: 2,000,000	MC: 3× Platinum; ARIA: Platinum; BPI: 2× Platinum; BVMI: Gold; RIAA: 3× Platinum; RMNZ: 3× Platinum	Let Go
"I'm with You"	2002	18	—	13	13	5	—	5	12	7	4	UK: 290,000; US: 1,000,000	MC: Platinum; BPI: Platinum; RIAA: Platinum; RMNZ: Platinum	Let Go
"Losing Grip"	2003	—	20	40	43	—	—	—	49	22	64			Let Go
"Mobile"	2003	—	—	—	—	—	—	26	—	—	—			Let Go
"Don't Tell Me"	2004	5	10	12	10	4	35	15	9	5	22		ARIA: Gold; RIAA: Gold	Under My Skin
"My Happy Ending"	2004	11	6	8	17	7	76	—	23	5	9	US: 1,200,000	MC: Platinum; ARIA: Gold; BPI: Gold; RIAA: 2× Platinum; RMNZ: Gold	Under My Skin
"Nobody's Home"	2004	4	24	20	29	—	128	—	35	24	41		MC: Gold; RIAA: Gold	Under My Skin
"He Wasn't"	2005	75	25	35	29	—	—	38	43	23	—			Under My Skin
"Fall to Pieces"	2005	—	—	—	—	—	—	—	—	—	— (Note: "Fall to Pieces" did not enter the Billboard Hot 100, but peaked at number six on the Bubbling Under Hot 100 chart.)			Under My Skin
"Keep Holding On"	2006	14	— (Note: "Keep Holding On" did not enter the ARIA Top 100 Singles Chart, but peaked at number five on the ARIA Digital Track Chart.)	—	—	21	—	—	—	141	17	US: 1,600,000	MC: Platinum; BPI: Silver; RIAA: Platinum	Eragon and The Best Damn Thing
"Girlfriend"	2007	1	1	1	3	1	27	1	3	2	1	World: 7,300,000; UK: 535,000; US: 3,800,000	MC: 4× Platinum; ARIA: 4× Platinum; BPI: 2× Platinum; BVMI: Gold; IFPI AUT: Gold; RIAA: 7× Platinum; RIAJ: Million; RMNZ: 2× Platinum	The Best Damn Thing
"When You're Gone"	2007	8	4	10	17	4	83	26	14	3	24	UK: 352,000; US: 1,290,000	MC: 2× Platinum; ARIA: Platinum; BPI: Gold; RIAA: 2× Platinum; RIAJ: Gold; RMNZ: Gold	The Best Damn Thing
"Hot"	2007	10	14	17	26	—	91	30	61	30	95	US: 446,000	ARIA: Gold	The Best Damn Thing
"The Best Damn Thing"	2008	76	—	51	64	—	—	—	—	—	— (Note: "The Best Damn Thing" did not enter the Billboard Hot 100, but peaked at number seven on the Bubbling Under Hot 100 chart.)			The Best Damn Thing
"Alice"	2010	51	39	19	27	25	—	—	73	59	71	US: 373,000	RIAJ: Gold	Almost Alice
"What the Hell"	2011	8	6	20	21	15	15	5	18	16	11	US: 2,100,000	MC: 4× Platinum; ARIA: 2× Platinum; BPI: Platinum; FIMI: Gold; RIAA: 4× Platinum; RIAJ: 2× Platinum; RMNZ: 2× Platinum	Goodbye Lullaby
"Smile"	2011	59	25	37	40	97	—	30	—	189	68		ARIA: Platinum; RIAA: Platinum	Goodbye Lullaby
"Wish You Were Here"	2011	64	—	—	—	59	—	—	—	—	65			Goodbye Lullaby
"Here's to Never Growing Up"	2013	17	15	49	60	19	—	24	—	14	20	US: 1,300,000	MC: 3× Platinum; ARIA: Platinum; BPI: Silver; RIAA: 2× Platinum; RMNZ: Gold	Avril Lavigne
"Rock n Roll"	2013	37	45	—	—	46	48	—	—	68	91		MC: Gold; RIAJ: Gold	Avril Lavigne
"Let Me Go" (featuring Chad Kroeger)	2013	12	77	32	63	41	—	—	63	66	78		MC: Platinum	Avril Lavigne
"Hello Kitty"	2014	—	—	—	—	—	—	—	—	—	75			Avril Lavigne
"Give You What You Like"	2015	—	—	—	—	—	—	—	—	—	—			Avril Lavigne
"Head Above Water"	2018	37	75	30	69	97	— (Note: "Head Above Water" did not enter the Oricon Singles Chart, but peaked at number 28 on the Oricon Digital Singles Chart.)	— (Note: "Head Above Water" did not enter the NZ Top 40 Singles Chart, but peaked at number 21 on the NZ Hot Singles Chart.)	36	84	64		MC: 2× Platinum; RIAA: Platinum; RMNZ: Gold	Head Above Water
"Tell Me It's Over"	2018	—	—	—	—	—	—	— (Note: "Tell Me It's Over" did not enter the NZ Top 40 Singles Chart, but peaked at number 39 on the NZ Hot Singles Chart.)	—	—	— (Note: "Tell Me It's Over" did not enter the Billboard Hot 100, but peaked at number 36 on the Digital Songs chart.)			Head Above Water
"Dumb Blonde" (featuring Nicki Minaj)	2019	92	—	—	—	—	—	— (Note: "Dumb Blonde" did not enter the NZ Top 40 Singles Chart, but peaked at number 16 on the NZ Hot Singles Chart.)	—	—	—			Head Above Water
"I Fell in Love with the Devil"	2019	—	—	—	—	—	—	—	—	—	—			Head Above Water
"Bite Me"	2021	63	—	—	—	—	—	— (Note: "Bite Me" did not enter the NZ Top 40 Singles Chart, but peaked at number 19 on the NZ Hot Singles Chart.)	—	61	— (Note: "Bite Me" did not enter the Billboard Hot 100, but peaked at number 20 on the Bubbling Under Hot 100 chart.)		MC: Platinum	Love Sux
"Love It When You Hate Me" (featuring Blackbear)	2022	76	—	—	—	—	—	— (Note: "Love It When You Hate Me" did not enter the NZ Top 40 Singles Chart, but peaked at number nine on the NZ Hot Singles Chart.)	—	— (Note: "Love It When You Hate Me" did not enter the UK Singles Chart, but peaked at number 40 on the UK Singles Sales Chart.)	—			Love Sux
"I'm a Mess" (Note: This song only appears on the deluxe edition of Love Sux.) (with Yungblud)	2022	— (Note: "I'm a Mess" did not enter the Canadian Hot 100, but peaked at number 34 on the Hot Digital Songs chart.)	—	—	—	—	—	— (Note: "I'm a Mess" did not enter the NZ Top 40 Singles Chart, but peaked at number 39 on the NZ Hot Singles Chart.)	—	— (Note: "I'm a Mess" did not enter the UK Singles Chart, but peaked at number 28 on the UK Singles Sales Chart.)	—			Love Sux
"Fake as Hell" (with All Time Low)	2023	—	—	—	—	—	—	—	—	— (Note: "Fake as Hell" did not enter the UK Singles Chart, but peaked at number 52 on the UK Singles Sales Chart.)	—			Non-album singles
"Young & Dumb" (featuring Simple Plan)	2025	—	—	—	—	—	—	— (Note: "Young and Dumb" did not enter the NZ Top 40 Singles Chart, but peaked at number 33 on the NZ Hot Singles Chart.)	—	— (Note: "Young & Dumb" did not enter the UK Singles Chart, but peaked at number 32 on the UK Singles Sales Chart.)	—			Non-album singles
"—" denotes a recording that did not chart or was not released in that territory.

=== As featured artist ===
List of singles as featured artist, with selected chart positions and showing year released
Title	Year	Peak chart positions							Album
Title	Year	CAN Dig.	NZ Hot	UK Sales	US Bub.	US Adult Pop	US Count.	US Rock	Album
"Best Years of Our Lives" (Evan Taubenfeld featuring Avril Lavigne)	2011	—	—	—	—	—	—	—	Non-album single
"Listen"(One Ok Rock featuring Avril Lavigne) (Note: Reached number 93 on Billboard Japan Hot 100.)	2017	—	—	—	—	—	—	—	Ambitions
"Flames" (Mod Sun featuring Avril Lavigne)	2021	50	40	74	—	—	—	35	Internet Killed the Rockstar
"Can You Die from a Broken Heart" (Nate Smith featuring Avril Lavigne)	2024	22	—	92	2	—	29	—	California Gold
"77" (Billy Idol featuring Avril Lavigne)	2025	—	—	— (Note: "77" did not enter the UK Singles Sales Chart, but peaked at number 24 on the Official Physical Singles Chart.)	—	19	—	—	Dream Into It
"—" denotes a recording that did not chart or was not released in that territory.

=== Promotional singles ===
List of promotional singles, with selected chart positions and showing year released
Title	Year	Peak chart positions						Certifications	Album
Title	Year	CAN	JPN Hot	KOR	NZ Hot	US Dance Elec.	US Rock	Certifications	Album
"Basket Case"	2003	—	—	—	—	—	—		My World
"Knockin' on Heaven's Door"	2003	—	—	— (Note: "Knockin' on Heaven's Door" did not enter the Circle Cumulative Digital Chart, but peaked at number 135 on the Circle Foreign Digital Chart.)	—	—	—		My World
"Unwanted"	2003	—	—	—	—	—	—		Let Go
"I Always Get What I Want"	2004	—	—	—	—	—	—		Under My Skin
"Take Me Away"	2004	—	—	—	—	—	—		Under My Skin
"O Holy Night" (with Chantal Kreviazuk)	2004	—	—	—	—	—	—		Maybe This Christmas Too?
"I Will Be"	2007	—	—	—	—	—	—		The Best Damn Thing
"Push"	2012	—	35	191	—	—	—		Goodbye Lullaby
"Bad Reputation"	2012	—	8	—	—	—	—	RIAJ: Gold	One Piece Film: Z
"How You Remind Me"	2012	—	—	—	—	—	—		One Piece Film: Z
"Baby It's Cold Outside" (with Jonny Blu)	2017	—	—	—	—	—	—		Non-album promotional single
"Bois Lie" (featuring Machine Gun Kelly)	2022	85	—	—	15	—	22		Love Sux
"Eyes Wide Shut" (with Illenium and Travis Barker)	2023	—	—	—	24	9	27		Illenium
"Bulletproof" (Nate Smith featuring Avril Lavigne)	2024	—	—	—	—	—	—		Non-album promotional single
"—" denotes a recording that did not chart or was not released in that territory.

=== Charity singles ===
List of charity singles, with selected chart positions, showing year charted and album name
Title	Year	Peak chart positions			Certifications
Title	Year	CAN	UK	US Dig.	Certifications
"Wavin' Flag" (among the Young Artists for Haiti)	2010	1	89	—	MC: 3× Platinum
"Fly"	2015	92	—	—	
"Right Where I'm Supposed to Be" (with Ryan Tedder, Luis Fonsi, Hussain Al Jassmi, Assala and Tamer Hosny)	2019	—	—	—	
"We Are Warriors"	2020	— (Note: "We Are Warriors" did not enter the Canadian Hot 100, but peaked at number 23 on the Hot Digital Songs chart.)	— (Note: "We Are Warriors" did not enter the UK Singles Chart, but peaked at number 100 on the UK Singles Sales Chart.)	24	
"Lean on Me" (among the ArtistsCAN)	2020	13	—	—	
"—" denotes a recording that did not chart or was not released in that territory.

== Other charted songs ==
List of other charted songs, with selected chart positions, showing year released and album name
Title	Year	Peak chart positions									Album
Title	Year	CAN	CAN AC	CAN Hot AC	KOR	UK	UK Rock	US Bub.	US Pop 100	US Rock	Album
"Runaway"	2007	—	—	—	—	—	—	11	94	—	The Best Damn Thing
"Innocence"	2007	59	25	14	—	190	—	16	—	—	The Best Damn Thing
"Black Star"	2011	—	—	—	— (Note: "Black Star" did not enter the Circle Cumulative Digital Chart, but peaked at number 39 on the Circle Foreign Digital Chart.)	—	—	—	*	—	Goodbye Lullaby
"Stop Standing There"	2011	—	—	—	— (Note: "Stop Standing There" did not enter the Circle Cumulative Digital Chart, but peaked at number 52 on the Circle Foreign Digital Chart.)	—	—	—	*	—	Goodbye Lullaby
"I Love You"	2011	—	—	—	— (Note: "I Love You" did not enter the Circle Cumulative Digital Chart, but peaked at number 41 on the Circle Foreign Digital Chart.)	—	—	—	*	—	Goodbye Lullaby
"Everybody Hurts"	2011	—	—	—	— (Note: "Everybody Hurts" did not enter the Circle Cumulative Digital Chart, but peaked at number 33 on the Circle Foreign Digital Chart.)	—	—	—	*	—	Goodbye Lullaby
"Not Enough"	2011	—	—	—	— (Note: "Not Enough" did not enter the Circle Cumulative Digital Chart, but peaked at number 54 on the Circle Foreign Digital Chart.)	—	—	—	*	—	Goodbye Lullaby
"4 Real"	2011	—	—	—	— (Note: "4 Real" did not enter the Circle Cumulative Digital Chart, but peaked at number 47 on the Circle Foreign Digital Chart.)	—	—	—	*	—	Goodbye Lullaby
"Darlin"	2011	—	—	—	— (Note: "Darlin" did not enter the Circle Cumulative Digital Chart, but peaked at number 58 on the Circle Foreign Digital Chart.)	—	—	—	*	—	Goodbye Lullaby
"Remember When"	2011	—	—	—	— (Note: "Remember When" did not enter the Circle Cumulative Digital Chart, but peaked at number 57 on the Circle Foreign Digital Chart.)	—	—	—	*	—	Goodbye Lullaby
"Goodbye"	2011	—	—	—	— (Note: "Goodbye" did not enter the Circle Cumulative Digital Chart, but peaked at number 59 on the Circle Foreign Digital Chart.)	—	—	—	*	—	Goodbye Lullaby
"17"	2013	—	—	—	82	—	—	—	*	—	Avril Lavigne
"Bitchin' Summer"	2013	—	—	—	170	—	—	—	*	—	Avril Lavigne
"Bad Girl" (featuring Marilyn Manson)	2013	88	—	—	— (Note: "Bad Girl" did not enter the Circle Cumulative Digital Chart, but peaked at number 69 on the Circle Foreign Digital Chart.)	—	21	—	*	—	Avril Lavigne
"You Ain't Seen Nothin' Yet"	2013	—	—	—	— (Note: "You Ain't Seen Nothin' Yet" did not enter the Circle Cumulative Digital Chart, but peaked at number 20 on the Circle Foreign Digital Chart.)	—	—	—	*	—	Avril Lavigne
"Sippin' on Sunshine"	2013	—	—	—	— (Note: "Sippin' on Sunshine" did not enter the Circle Cumulative Digital Chart, but peaked at number 19 on the Circle Foreign Digital Chart.)	—	—	—	*	—	Avril Lavigne
"Hello Heartache"	2013	—	—	—	— (Note: "Hello Heartache" did not enter the Circle Cumulative Digital Chart, but peaked at number 75 on the Circle Foreign Digital Chart.)	—	—	—	*	—	Avril Lavigne
"Falling Fast"	2013	—	—	—	— (Note: "Falling Fast" did not enter the Circle Cumulative Digital Chart, but peaked at number 64 on the Circle Foreign Digital Chart.)	—	—	—	*	—	Avril Lavigne
"Hush Hush"	2013	—	—	—	— (Note: "Hush Hush" did not enter the Circle Cumulative Digital Chart, but peaked at number 71 on the Circle Foreign Digital Chart.)	—	—	—	*	—	Avril Lavigne
"Grow" (with Willow featuring Travis Barker)	2021	—	—	—	—	—	—	—	*	46	Lately I Feel Everything
"—" denotes a recording that did not chart or was not released in that territory. "*" denotes the chart is discontinued.

== Videography ==
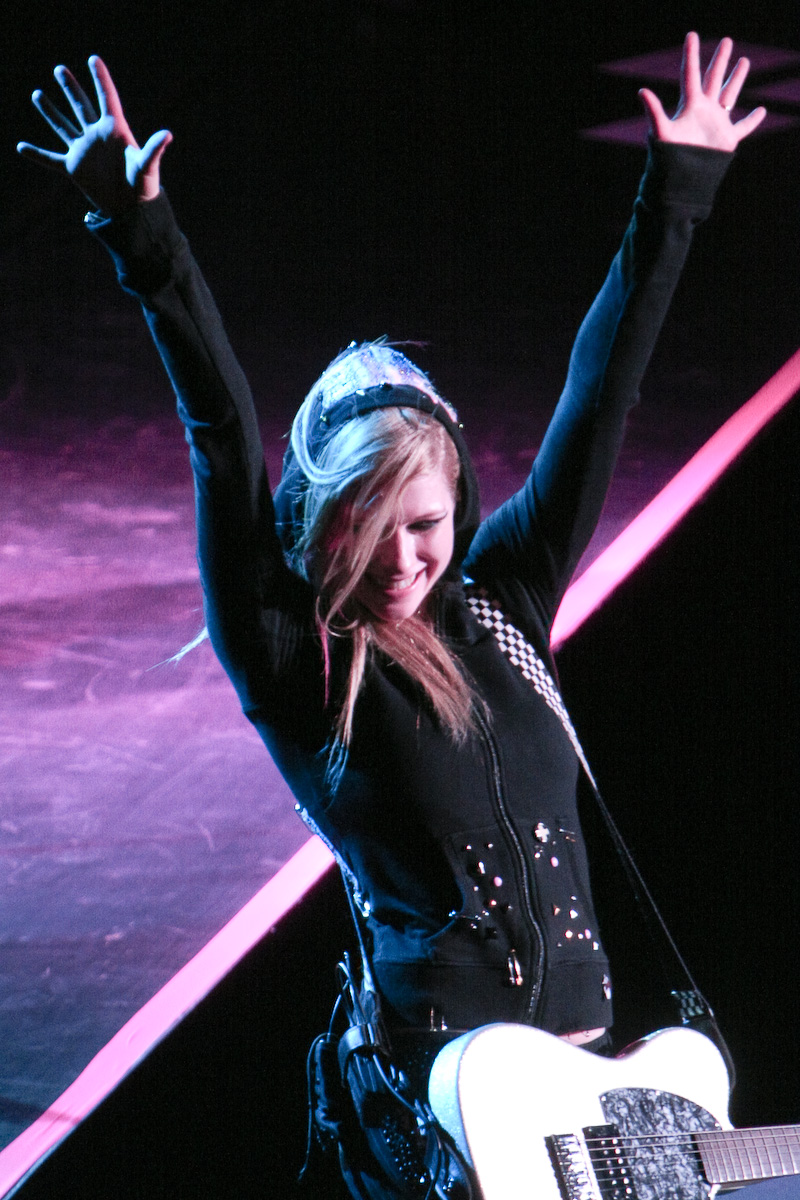
Lavigne performing on her The Best Damn World Tour in Beijing, China in October 2008.

=== Video albums ===
List of DVD releases with selected details and certifications
Title	Album details	Certifications (DVD)
My Favorite Videos (So Far)	Released: 2004; Label: Arista; Formats: DVD	
Bonez Tour 2005: Live at Budokan	Released: December 7, 2005 (Japan only); Label: BMG; Formats: DVD	RIAJ: Gold
The Best Damn Tour: Live in Toronto	Released: September 9, 2008; Label: RCA; Formats: DVD	MC: Gold

=== Music videos ===
List of music videos, showing year released, other artists featured and directors
Title	Year	Other artist(s)	Director(s)	Ref.
As lead artist
"Complicated"	2002	None	The Malloys	
"Sk8er Boi"	2002	None	Francis Lawrence	
"I'm with You"	2002	None	David LaChapelle	
"Losing Grip"	2003	None	Liz Friedlander	
"Mobile"	2003	None	Unknown	
"Knockin' on Heaven's Door"	2003	None	Marc Lostracco	
"Don't Tell Me"	2004	None	Liz Friedlander	
"My Happy Ending"	2004	None	Meiert Avis	
"Nobody's Home"	2004	None	Diane Martel	
"SpongeBob SquarePants Theme"	2004	None	Unknown	
"He Wasn't"	2005	None	The Malloys	
"Girlfriend"	2007	None	The Malloys	
"When You're Gone"	2007	None	Marc Klasfeld	
"Girlfriend" (Dr. Luke remix)	2007	Lil' Mama	R. Malcolm Jones	
"Hot"	2007	None	Matthew Rolston	
"The Best Damn Thing"	2008	None	Wayne Isham	
"Alice"	2010	None	Dave Meyers	
"What the Hell"	2011	None	Marcus Raboy	
"Smile"	2011	None	Shane Drake	
"Wish You Were Here"	2011	None	Dave Meyers	
"Goodbye"	2012	None	Mark Liddell	
"Here's to Never Growing Up"	2013	None	Robert Hales	
"Rock n Roll"	2013	None	Chris Marrs Piliero	
"Let Me Go"	2013	Chad Kroeger	Christopher Sims	
"Hello Kitty"	2014	None	Hisashi Kikuchi	
"Give You What You Like"	2015	None	Unknown	
"Fly"	2015	None	Avril Lavigne; Robb Dipple	
"Head Above Water"	2018	None	Elliott Lester	
"Tell Me It's Over"	2018	None	Erica Silverman	
"I Fell in Love with the Devil"	2019	None	Elliott Lester	
"We Are Warriors"	2020	None	Unknown	
"Grow"	2021	Willow; Travis Barker	Dana Trippe	
"Bite Me"	2021	None	Hannah Lux Davis	
"Bite Me" (acoustic)	2021	None	Mod Sun	
"Love It When You Hate Me"	2022	Blackbear	Audrey Ellis Fox	
"Bois Lie"	2022	Machine Gun Kelly	Nathan James	
"I'm a Mess"	2022	Yungblud	P. Tracy	
As featured artist
"Wavin' Flag"	2010	Young Artists for Haiti	Dave Russell	
"Lean on Me"	2020	ArtistsCAN	Unknown	
"Flames"	2021	Mod Sun	Mod Sun; Charlie Zwick	
"Flames" (acoustic)	2021	Mod Sun	Sam Cahil	
"Can You Die from a Broken Heart"	2024	Nate Smith	Unknown	
Guest appearances
"Hundred Million"	2002	Treble Charger	Wendy Morgan	
"Bethamphetamine (Pretty Pretty)"	2006	Butch Walker	Moh Azima	
"Cheers (Drink to That)"	2011	Rihanna	Evan Rogers	
"Down"	2021	Mod Sun; Travis Barker	Louie Torrellas	

== See also ==
- List of songs performed by Avril Lavigne
- List of best-selling albums by women
