= List of Avril Lavigne promotional tours =

The following is a chronological list of Canadian singer Avril Lavigne's promotional tours. For her concert tours, see List of Avril Lavigne concert tours.

== Live by Surprise Tour ==
Live by Surprise Tour
- Promotional tour by Avril Lavigne
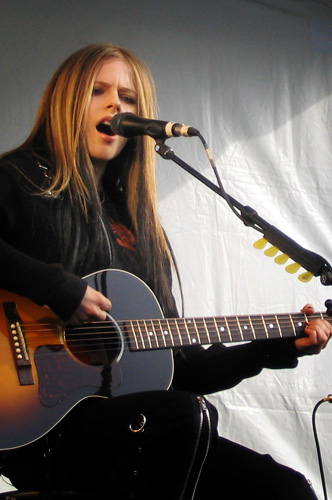
- Lavigne performing in Burnaby
- Location: Europe; North America
- Associated album: Under My Skin
- Start date: March 4, 2004
- End date: April 27, 2004
- Legs: 1
- No. of shows: 26

Avril Lavigne concert chronology
- Try to Shut Me Up Tour (2002–2003); Live by Surprise Tour (2004); Bonez Tour (2004–2005)

The Live by Surprise Tour was also called the Top Secret Mall Tour. It performed at malls in the United States and Canada. Lavigne showcased acoustic renditions of her previous hits and songs from her new set, Under My Skin (2004). Details of each location were not revealed until 48 hours before the event commenced.

=== Setlist ===
1. "He Wasn't"
2. "My Happy Ending"
3. "Sk8er Boi"
4. "Don't Tell Me"
5. "Take Me Away"
6. "Complicated"
7. "Nobody's Home"

UK Setlist

1. "Sk8er Boi"
2. "Nobody's Fool"
3. "My World"
4. "Losing Grip"
5. "Complicated"
6. "Mobile"
7. "Thing's I'll Never Say"
8. "Naked"
9. "Unwanted"
10. "I'm with You (encore)"

=== Tour dates ===
Date	City	Country	Venue
March 4, 2004	Bloomington	United States	Mall of America
March 5, 2004	Racine	United States	Regency Mall
March 8, 2004	West Dundee	United States	Spring Hill Mall
March 9, 2004	Troy	United States	Somerset Mall
March 11, 2004	Toronto	Canada	Fairview Mall
March 12, 2004	Orléans	Canada	Place d'Orléans
March 15, 2004	Laval	Canada	Carrefour Laval
March 16, 2004	Boston	United States	Shops at Prudential Center
March 17, 2004	Paramus	United States	Westfield Garden State Plaza
March 18, 2004	Philadelphia	United States	Franklin Mills
March 19, 2004	Bethesda	United States	Westfield Montgomery
March 22, 2004	Alpharetta	United States	North Point Mall
March 23, 2004	Florence	United States	Florence Mall
March 24, 2004	Strongsville	United States	SouthPark Mall
March 25, 2004	Indianapolis	United States	Glendale Town Center
March 26, 2004	Florissant	United States	Jamestown Mall
April 1, 2004	Calgary	Canada	Southcentre Mall
April 6, 2004	Burnaby	Canada	Eaton Centre Metrotown
April 7, 2004	Tukwila	United States	Southcenter Mall
April 8, 2004	Clackamas	United States	Clackamas Town Center
April 9, 2004	Hayward	United States	Southland Mall
April 12, 2004	Glendale	United States	Glendale Galleria
April 13, 2004	Mesa	United States	Fiesta Mall
April 14, 2004	Littleton	United States	Southwest Plaza
April 15, 2004	Katy	United States	Katy Mills
April 16, 2004	Lewisville	United States	Vista Ridge Mall
April 27, 2004	London	England	Camden Barfly

== The Best Damn Thing Promotional Tour ==
The Best Damn Thing Promotional Tour
- Promotional tour by Avril Lavigne
- Promotional poster for tour
- Location: Asia; Europe; North America
- Associated album: The Best Damn Thing
- Start date: February 16, 2007
- End date: December 16, 2007
- Legs: 3
- No. of shows: 43

Avril Lavigne concert chronology
- Bonez Tour (2004–2005); The Best Damn Thing Promotional Tour (2007); The Best Damn Tour (2008)

The Best Damn Thing Promotional Tour reached North America, Europe and Asia, and supported her third studio album, The Best Damn Thing (2007). Lavigne performed at several music festivals in the United States, United Kingdom, Ireland, Germany and France. The premiere concert in Calgary was filmed for her first television special, "Avril Lavigne: Exclusive". The tour was filmed and broadcast on the Internet for several of the festivals in Europe. The trek ended a few months before the singer began her third concert tour.

=== Setlist ===
Set I

July 7, 2007

1. "Girlfriend"
2. "Sk8er Boi"
3. "My Happy Ending"
4. "I Always Get What I Want"
5. "Losing Grip" (contains elements of "Kashmir")
6. "I'm with You"
7. "Everything Back But You"
8. "The Best Damn Thing"
9. "He Wasn't"
10. "All the Small Things"
11. "Complicated"
Set II

Mexico City

1. "Girlfriend"
2. "I Can Do Better"
3. "Complicated"
4. "My Happy Ending"
5. "Hot"
6. "I Always Get What I Want"
7. "I'm with You"
8. "Tomorrow"
9. "Don't Tell Me"
10. "When You're Gone"
11. "Everything Back But You"
12. "The Best Damn Thing"
13. "He Wasn't"

Encore

15. "All the Small Things"
16. "Sk8er Boi"

=== Tour dates ===
List of 2007 concerts
Date	City	Country	Venue
February 16, 2007	Calgary	Canada	Grand Theatre
March 5, 2007^{[A]}	Los Angeles	United States	Fox Studios Lot
March 19, 2007	London	England	Scala
March 25, 2007^{[B]}	Paris	France	Élysée Montmartre
May 16, 2007	New York City	United States	Times Square
June 7, 2007^{[C]}	Las Vegas	United States	Pearl Concert Theater
June 22, 2007^{[D]}	Paris	France	Zénith de Paris
June 26, 2007	Madrid	Spain	Circo Price
June 28, 2007	Amsterdam	Netherlands	Hotel Arena
June 29, 2007^{[E]}	Catania	Italy	Piazza del Duomo
July 1, 2007^{[F]}	Gothenburg	Sweden	Frihamnen
July 2, 2007	Berlin	Germany	Europa-Center
July 3, 2007^{[G]}	Brussels	Belgium	Place de Brouckère
July 7, 2007^{[H]}	Naas	Ireland	Punchestown Racecourse
July 8, 2007^{[I]}	Perth and Kinross	Scotland	Balado
July 10, 2007^{[J]}	Locarno	Switzerland	Piazza Grande di Locarno
July 11, 2007^{[K]}	Frankfurt	Germany	Opernplatz
July 12, 2007^{[K]}	Hamburg	Germany	Stadtpark
July 14, 2007^{[L]}	Istanbul	Turkey	Parkorman
July 17, 2007^{[M]}	Athens	Greece	Olympic Stadium
July 18, 2007^{[N]}	Rome	Italy	Ippodromo delle Capannelle
July 19, 2007^{[O]}	Bern	Switzerland	Gurten
August 3, 2007^{[P]}	Grand Prairie	United States	Nokia Live
August 11, 2007^{[Q]}	Chiba	Japan	Chiba Marine Stadium
August 12, 2007^{[Q]}	Osaka	Japan	Maishima Sports Island
August 15, 2007	Shanghai	China	Shanghai Qi Zhong Tennis Center
August 17, 2007	Hong Kong		AsiaWorld–Arena
August 18, 2007	Hong Kong		AsiaWorld–Arena
October 5, 2007	Moscow	Russia	Club B1 Maximum
October 19, 2007	Zapopan	Mexico	Telmex Auditorium
October 21, 2007	Monterrey	Mexico	Auditorio Coca-Cola
October 23, 2007	Mexico City	Mexico	Palacio de los Deportes
November 28, 2007^{[R]}	Montreal	Canada	Bell Centre
December 1, 2007^{[S]}	Stockton	United States	Stockton Arena
December 2, 2007	Burnaby	Canada	Swangard Stadium
December 3, 2007^{[T]}	Portland	United States	Rose Garden
December 5, 2007^{[U]}	Council Bluffs	United States	Mid-America Center
December 7, 2007^{[T]}	Minneapolis	United States	Target Center
December 9, 2007^{[V]}	Houston	United States	Toyota Center
December 10, 2007^{[W]}	Duluth	United States	Arena at Gwinnett Center
December 13, 2007^{[T]}	Lowell	United States	Tsongas Arena
December 14, 2007^{[T]}	New York City	United States	Madison Square Garden
December 16, 2007^{[T]}	Camden	United States	Susquehanna Bank Center

Festivals and other miscellaneous performances

^{A} This concert was a part of "Nissan Live Sets on Yahoo! Music".
^{B} This concert was a part of "MTV Live".
^{C} This concert was a part of "Nina's Night Out".
^{D} This concert was a part of "Europe 2 Live".
^{E} This concert was a part of "Festivalbar".
^{F} This concert was a part of "Pier Pressure"
^{G} This concert was a part of the "Wilkinson American Movie Day".
^{H} This concert was a part of "Oxegen".
^{I} This concert was a part of "T in the Park".
^{J} This concert was a part of the "Moon and Stars Festival".
^{K} These concerts were a part of the "Opern Air Festival".

^{L} This concert was a part of "Masstival".
^{M} This concert was a part of the "Fly Beeyond Festival".
^{N} This concert was a part of the "Roma Rock Festival".
^{O} This concert was a part of "Gurtenfestival".
^{P} This concert was a part of "106.1 KISS FM's KISS Party".
^{Q} These concerts were a part of the "Summer Sonic Festival"
^{R} This concert was a part of "Unite Against AIDS".
^{S} This concert was a part of the "KHOP@95.1's Jingle Ball".
^{T} These concerts were a part of "Jingle Ball".
^{U} This concert was a part of the "Q98.5 Santa Slam".
^{V} This concert was a part of the "KRBE 104.1's Jingle Jam".
^{W} This concert was a part of "Star 94's Jingle Jam".

== See also ==
- List of Avril Lavigne concert tours
