= The Best Damn Tour: Live in Toronto =

Video by Avril Lavigne
- Released: September 5, 2008
- Recorded: April 7, 2008
- Venue: Air Canada Centre (Toronto, Canada)
- Genre: Pop punk; alternative rock
- Length: 1:14:00
- Label: RCA
- Director: Wayne Isham
- Producer: Dana Marshall

Avril Lavigne video chronology
Bonez Tour 2005: Live at Budokan (2005)	The Best Damn Tour: Live in Toronto (2008)

The Best Damn Tour: Live in Toronto is a live music DVD from Canadian singer Avril Lavigne. It was shot at the sold-out Air Canada Centre concert in Toronto, Ontario, Canada on April 7, 2008 during the Best Damn Tour. It was released on September 9, 2008 in North America and on September 5, 2008 in Europe. In the USA there were clean and explicit versions of the DVD.

== Background ==
The Best Damn World Tour was the third concert tour by Avril Lavigne. It supported her third studio album The Best Damn Thing, and visited North America, Europe, and Asia. It was also her first concert in three years, following the Bonez Tour in 2005. The tour was announced on November 6, 2007 at the West Hollywood nightclub Whisky a Go Go. Lavigne intended for the tour to be "showy," commenting that the "theme is like a party!" The tour included backup dancers, outfit changes, and a moving stage, with Lavigne hiring three choreographers—Lindsey Blaufarb, Craig Hollaman and Jamie King—in order to achieve her intended theme and vision. The tour garnered mixed reviews from contemporary critics.

After the tour was over, industry reports presented that it earned US$12.3 million ($17.96 million in 2024 dollars) in total, from 110 shows and eventually played in front of nearly 170,000 people throughout North America, Europe, and Asia averaging at $861,599 ($1.27 million in 2024 dollars) per show. Despite the cancellation of the tour's final North American dates, The Best Damn Tour became Lavigne's highest-grossing concert tour.

== Synopsis ==
The concert starts off with an anonymous source spraying "Avril" on the screen in black graffiti, and then is colored in with bright pink. When its fully colored, pink lights shine, stars flash on the screen and her back up dancers run on with pink flags displaying the logo of her third album. A short instrumental of "Girlfriend" plays, as the flags are waved across the stage. Lavigne comes up on an elevator to perform "Girlfriend". Lavigne briefly talks to the audience and introduces the next track "I Can Do Better". Throughout the concert, Lavigne plays acoustic and electric guitar, drums and piano. A selection of tracks include "Sk8er Boi", "My Happy Ending", "When You're Gone" and the remix of "Girlfriend" featuring Lil' Mama.

== Track listing ==
Taken from the back casing of The Best Damn Tour: Live in Toronto US DVD release.

No.	Title	Writer(s)	Length
1.	"Intro"	Avril Lavigne; Lukasz Gottwald	1:29
2.	"Girlfriend"	Lavigne; Gottwald	3:56
3.	"I Can Do Better"	Lavigne; Lauren Christy; Scott Spock; Graham Edwards	4:31
4.	"Complicated"	Lavigne; Butch Walker	4:20
5.	"My Happy Ending"	Lavigne; Christy; Spock; Edwards	5:20
6.	"I'm with You"	Lavigne; Clif Magness	4:02
7.	"I Always Get What I Want"		3:35
8.	"Best Damn Dance Break"	Lavigne; Walker	1:26
9.	"When You're Gone"	Lavigne; Evan Taubenfeld	3:53
10.	"Innocence"	Lavigne; Taubenfeld	2:29
11.	"Don't Tell Me"	Lavigne; Taubenfeld	2:08
12.	"Hot"	Lavigne; Magness	3:20
13.	"Losing Grip"	Lavigne; Walker	2:14
14.	"Bad Reputation" (Video Montage)	Joan Jett	2:44
15.	"Everything Back but You"	Lavigne; Gottwald; Kara DioGuardi	4:03
16.	"Avril on Drums" (Runaway/Hey Mickey)	Mike Chapman; Nicky Chinn	3:03
17.	"The Best Damn Thing"	Lavigne; Walker	5:02
18.	"I Don't Have to Try"	Lavigne; Gottwald	3:19
19.	"He Wasn't"	Lavigne; Chantal Kreviazuk	5:39
20.	"Girlfriend (Remix)" (Encore)	Lavigne; Gottwald; Niatia Kirkland	2:16
21.	"Sk8er Boi" (Encore)	Lavigne; Christy; Spock; Edwards	5:39
Total length:			74:00

Notes

- MTV Live premiered a condensed 54-minute version of the concert on January 10, 2009, omitting the performances of "I Can Do Better", "I Always Get What I Want", "Best Damn Dance Break", "Hot", "Everything Back but You", and "I Don't Have to Try".

== Personnel ==
Credits adapted from The Best Damn Tour: Live in Toronto DVD liner notes.

- Avril Lavigne – main performer, vocals, rhythm guitar, piano
- Wayne Isham – director
- Jamie King – director for the stage
- Chuck Ozeas – director of photography
- Dana Marshall – producer
- Samantha Lecca – executive producer
- Joseph Uliano – executive producer
- Neil Maiers – executive producer
- Carla Kama – assistant stage director
- Jamie King – choreographer
- Lindsey Blaufarb – choreographer, dancer
- Craig Hollaman – choreographer
- Sofia Toufa – additional choreographer, dancer, vocals
- Deryck Whibley – audio mixing, back cover photo
- Bob Ludwig – audio mastering
- Jim McGorman – music director, rhythm guitar, vocals
- Stephen Ferlazzo – keyboards
- Al Berry – bass
- Rodney Howard – drums
- Steve Fekete – lead guitar
- Jaime Burgos III – dancer
- Jesse Brown – dancer
- Sara Von Gillern – dancer
- Caitlin Lotz – dancer, vocals
- Tina Kennedy – manager
- Dan Cleland – tour manager
- Derick Henry – director of security
- Matthew Lavigne – security
- Jon Zivcovic – security
- Dale Lynch – production manager
- Gail Nishi – tour assistant
- Brian Kutzman – guitar tech
- Ian O'Neill – drum tech
- Brent Clark – lighting director
- Matt Peskie – monitor engineer
- Jim Yakubushi – FOH engineer
- Mikee Cusack – merchandisers
- Josh Briand – merchandisers
- Mark "Sparky" Mcilvenna – lead driver
- Gabriel Panduro – hair/makeup
- Louise Kennedy – wardrobe supervisor
- Amie Darlow – artist wardrobe/assistant
- Leah Smith – costumer
- William Crooks – video screen director
- Daniel DeShara – video screen engineer
- Daryn Barry – audio mixing at Orange Lounge, audio recording engineer
- Geoff McLean – Toronto production supervisor
- William Crooks – technical director
- Connie Isham – script supervisor
- Kelsey Larkin – production coordinator
- Hayden Currie – production assistant
- Quillan Docherty – production assistant
- Adam Angeloni – production assistant
- Alan Sukonnik – production assistant
- Simon Rodriguez – production assistant
- Jeff Schwartz – production assistant
- Eric Oh – Steadicam operator
- George Lajtais – crane operator
- Jean Pellerin – camera operators
- Alex Poppas – camera operators
- John Asquwith – camera operators
- Ted Perrotta – camera operators
- Jim Flaxman – camera operators
- Steven Chung – camera operators
- Alex Gomez – camera operators
- Michael Bailey – camera assistants
- Joe Chan – camera assistants
- Laina Knox – camera assistants
- Mike G – key grip
- Peter Newman – best boy grip
- Justin Beattie – grip
- Anthoni Shilello – crane assistant
- Dome Productions – video truck
- Ivar Boriss – video truck manager
- Dave Schick – video truck tech manager
- Chris Romanick – technical director
- Elliott Cristofoli – engineers
- Andrew Poisson – engineers
- Bryan Bosley – engineers
- John Carlyle – audio operator #1
- Edward Lundy – audio operator #2
- Pat Denardis – evs operator
- Mark Scott – video operator
- Victor Bruck – video operator
- Andrew Budziak – associated telecasters
- Jordan Szabo – associated telecasters
- Matt Dorozovec – associated telecasters
- Cory Dynes – associated telecasters
- Veneno, Inc. – screen imagery
- Editgods – edit facility
- Guy Harding – editors
- Matt Edwards – editors
- Hector Lopez – online edit, colorist
- The Audio Truck, Inc. – audio mobile
- Doug McClement – mobile music recording engineer, audio assistants
- Jason "Metal" Donkersgoed – Pro Tools engineer
- Alex Bonenfant – Pro Tools engineer
- Danny Greenspoon – truck engineer
- Sam Ibbett – audio assistants
- Billy Burgomaster – audio assistants
- Terry McBride – management
- Mark Liddell – front cover photo
- David Bergman – all other photos
- John Rummen – DVD cover design
- Kim Kinakin – DVD package design

== Charts ==
Chart (2008)	Peak position
ARIA Top 50 Music DVD Chart	32
Austria Music DVD Top 10	5
Belgium DVD Chart (Flanders)	5
Belgium DVD Chart (Wallonia)	3
Czech Republic Music DVD Chart	3
Dutch Music DVD Chart	9
Estonia DVD Chart	9
Italy FIMI DVD Chart	3
Japan DVD Chart	1
Mexico DVD Chart	1
Spain PROMUSICAE DVD Chart	11
Swedish Music DVD Chart	7
UK DVD Chart	4
US Billboard Top Music Videos	7

== Certifications ==
Region	Certification	Certified units/sales
Canada (Music Canada)	Gold	5,000^{^}
^{^} Shipments figures based on certification alone.

== Release history ==
Release history for The Best Damn Tour: Live in Toronto
Region	Date	Label	Ref.
Brazil	September 5, 2008	Sony BMG	
Germany	September 5, 2008	Sony BMG	
Canada	September 9, 2008	Sony BMG	
United States	September 9, 2008	Sony BMG	
Japan	September 10, 2008	BMG Japan	
Russia	September 15, 2008	Sony BMG	
United Kingdom	September 15, 2008	Sony BMG	
Italy	September 19, 2008	Sony BMG	
