= Bonez Tour 2005: Live at Budokan =

Video by Avril Lavigne
- Released: December 7, 2005
- Recorded: March 10, 2005
- Venue: Nippon Budokan (Tokyo)
- Genres: Post-grunge; alternative rock; pop punk
- Length: 68:41
- Label: BMG Japan
- Director: Toru Uehara
- Producer: Toru Uehara

Avril Lavigne chronology
| Avril Lavigne: My World (2003) | Bonez Tour 2005: Live at Budokan (2005) | The Best Damn Tour: Live in Toronto (2008) |

Bonez Tour 2005: Live at Budokan is a DVD from Avril Lavigne's second tour, Bonez Tour, released in 2005. It was only released in Japan. The DVD comes with an insert with lyrics of the songs in Japanese and English, along with some behind-the-scenes information.

== Track listing ==
1. "He Wasn't"
2. "My Happy Ending"
3. "Take Me Away"
4. "Freak Out"
5. "Unwanted"
6. "Anything but Ordinary"
7. "Who Knows"
8. "I'm with You"
9. "Losing Grip"
10. "Together"
11. "Forgotten"
12. "Tomorrow"
13. "Nobody's Home"
14. "Fall to Pieces"
15. "Don't Tell Me"
16. "Sk8er Boi"
17. "Complicated"
18. "Slipped Away"
19. "Behind the Scenes" (1:57)

== Credits ==
- Avril Lavigne: Lead vocals, rhythm guitar, piano
- Devin Bronson: Lead guitar, backing vocals
- Craig Wood: Rhythm guitar, backing vocals
- Charles Moniz: Bass
- Matt Brann: Drums
- Filmed at Nippon Budokan on March 10, 2005
- Filmed by FIP
- Produced and directed by Toru Uehara
- Edited by Joe Ueno for IMAGICA
- All photos by Tony Mott
- DVD package design by Jam-0/John Rummen @ Artwerks Design
- Mixed by Tom Lord-Alge
- Mixed at South Beach Studios
- Assisted by Femio Hernandez

Behind the Scene bonus footage:

- Directed by Ryuzo Hirata, Ryoichiro Obata
- Edited by Yoshinori Saburi for IMAGICA

== Certifications ==
| Region | Certification | Certified units/sales |
|---|---|---|
| Japan (RIAJ) | Gold | 100,000^{^} |
^{^} Shipments figures based on certification alone.

== Release history ==
| Region | Edition | Date | Label |
|---|---|---|---|
| Japan | Standard | December 7, 2005 | BMG Japan |
| Japan | Limited Pressing | November 26, 2008 | BMG Japan |

== Awards ==
| Year | Awards ceremony | Award | Results |
|---|---|---|---|
| 2006 | Japan Golden Disc | Best DVD of the Year | Won |
