= I Always Get What I Want =

Promotional single by Avril Lavigne

from the album Under My Skin
- A-side: "Nobody's Home"
- Released: May 24, 2004
- Studio: Blue Iron Gate Studios (Santa Monica, CA); NRG Recording Services (North Hollywood, CA); Cello Studios (Hollywood, CA)
- Genre: Punk rock; hard rock
- Length: 2:31
- Label: Arista
- Songwriters: Avril Lavigne; Clif Magness
- Producer: Clif Magness

"I Always Get What I Want" is a song recorded by Canadian singer-songwriter Avril Lavigne for her second studio album Under My Skin (2004). The song was written by Lavigne and Clif Magness, while Magness solely handled production. The song was released digitally as a promotional single in the United States on May 24, 2004 by Arista Records. The song is included as a bonus track on European and Japanese versions of the album, then later included as an iTunes bonus track globally.

"I Always Get What I Want" is featured as a B-side on the "Nobody's Home" CD single, which is the third single release from Under My Skin. The song was also featured in the film The Princess Diaries 2: Royal Engagement, in addition to appearing on the film's official soundtrack release.

== Background and composition ==
"I Always Get What I Want" was written by Avril Lavigne and Clif Magness, with the latter handling production. Lavigne had previously worked with Magness on her debut album, Let Go (2002). Five songs were produced by Magness for the album: "Losing Grip", "Mobile", "Unwanted", "My World", and "Too Much to Ask". Following the release of Let Go, Lavigne worked with new collaborators for Under My Skin, including guitarist Evan Taubenfeld and singer Chantal Kreviazuk. Lavigne continued to work with Magness, although only "I Always Get What I Want" would appear on the reissued album in the form of a bonus track.

On May 24, 2004, the song was released digitally as a promotional single on iTunes. "Take Me Away" and "He Wasn't", both of which are present on the parent album, were also released as promotional singles on the same day. "I Always Get What I Want" was later re-released in November 2004 as a B-side to Nobody's Home, the third single from Under My Skin.

According to the sheet music published at Musicnotes.com by Alfred Publishing, the song is written in the key of C major and is set in time signature of common time with a tempo of 182 beats per minute. Lavigne's vocal range spans two octaves, from B_{3} to C_{5}. The lyrics of "I Always Get What I Want" carry a message of entitlement, with Lavigne dedicating the song to "any young girl out there who always gets what she wants".

== Reception ==
"I Always Get What I Want" received mixed reviews by music critics. Annabel Leathes of BBC Music compared the song to English alternative rock band Transvision Vamp, declaring that "'I Always Get What I Want' delivers a healthy slap in the face of authority ... and suggests that Avril isn't quite ready to grow up." Caroline Bansal of musicOMH gave the song a positive review, stating that the song "will have alternative music dance floors packed with its high octane guitar and vocals". The song was also praised for its placement on The Princess Diaries 2: Royal Engagement soundtrack, with Michael Paoletta of Billboard designating the track as a highlight from the album.

== Live performances ==
Lavigne first performed "I Always Get What I Want" at North American concert dates on her second worldwide concert tour, the Bonez Tour (2004–05). The performance of "I Always Get What I Want" during the tour at Nippon Budokan in Tokyo, Japan is included on Lavigne's second full-length DVD Bonez Tour 2005: Live at Budokan (2005). The DVD was released exclusively in Japan and was certified gold by the Recording Industry Association of Japan (RIAJ). Lavigne also performed the song on her third worldwide concert tour, The Best Damn World Tour (2008), with the performance of the song at the Air Canada Centre in Toronto, Canada being included on her third full-length DVD The Best Damn Tour: Live in Toronto (2008). The song has since appeared as a staple at Lavigne's concerts, being included on The Black Star Tour (2011–12), and The Avril Lavigne Tour (2013–14).

== Credits and personnel ==
Credits and personnel are adapted from the Under My Skin album liner notes.

- Avril Lavigne – vocals, writer
- Clif Magness – producer, writer, acoustic guitar, bass guitar, electric guitar, keyboards, mixing engineer, piano, programmer, recording engineer
- Mark Kiczula – assistant engineer
- Beau Fletcher - assistant engineer
- Josh Freese – drums
