= Under My Skin (Avril Lavigne album) =

Studio album by Avril Lavigne
- Released: May 21, 2004
- Studios: NRG Recording Services (North Hollywood); Ocean Way Studios (Hollywood); Ruby Red Productions (Atlanta); Satellite Park (Malibu); Skyline Studios (New York); The Boat (Los Angeles); Whitecoat Sound (Malibu); Ocean Studios (Burbank)
- Genres: Post-grunge; alternative rock; nu metal
- Length: 40:47
- Label: Arista
- Producers: Don Gilmore; Raine Maida; Butch Walker

Avril Lavigne chronology
Avril Lavigne: My World (2003)	Under My Skin (2004)	The Best Damn Thing (2007)

Singles from Under My Skin
- 1. "Don't Tell Me" Released: March 15, 2004; 2. "My Happy Ending" Released: June 14, 2004; 3. "Nobody's Home" Released: October 25, 2004; 4. "He Wasn't" Released: March 28, 2005; 5. "Fall to Pieces" Released: April 18, 2005

Under My Skin is the second studio album by Canadian singer-songwriter Avril Lavigne, released in Europe on May 21, 2004, and the rest of the world on May 25, 2004, by Arista Records. Lavigne wrote most of the album with singer-songwriter Chantal Kreviazuk, who invited her to a Malibu in-house recording studio she shared with her husband Raine Maida, where Lavigne recorded many of the songs. The album was produced by Maida, Don Gilmore, and Butch Walker. It was Lavigne's second and final studio album to be released by Arista, following Let Go (2002).

Under My Skin debuted at number one on the Canadian Albums Chart and on the US Billboard 200. It sold three million copies in the United States, ranking the album number 149 on the Billboard 200 decade-end chart. Because of the album's darker, heavier and more aggressive post-grunge sound, it received mixed to positive reviews, with critics now seeing the album as a classic that defined pop-punk in the early 2000s (despite it not being usually classified as such), and as anticipating the emotional intensity and theatrical aesthetics of emo pop later in the decade. On March 18, 2013, Under My Skin was re-released as a double-disc set paired with her debut studio album, Let Go, and released under Arista Records.

To promote the album, Lavigne went on a promotional tour for malls in the United States and Canada. Furthermore, Lavigne embarked on a concert tour, entitled the Bonez Tour, starting on September 26, 2004, and ending one year later on September 26, 2005. The concert at the Budokan arena in Japan was filmed and released on a DVD only available in Japan, entitled Bonez Tour 2005: Live at Budokan. Under My Skin has sold over 10 million copies worldwide and is the fifth best selling album of the 21st century by a Canadian artist.

== Background ==
Having no plans of working with producers or professional writers, Lavigne wrote much of the album with Canadian singer-songwriter Chantal Kreviazuk, with whom she had developed a friendship in the summer of 2003. Kreviazuk, whose husband Raine Maida's band Our Lady Peace opened for Lavigne's concert in Europe, introduced herself at an after-party for the SARS benefit concerts held in Toronto in June 2003. The following day, Lavigne and Kreviazuk ate lunch together, during which Lavigne shared how she wanted the development of the album to be. They wrote songs for almost three weeks at Maida's warehouse in Toronto. Kreviazuk invited Lavigne to continue working in a Malibu, California house she shared with Maida, which contained a recording studio. Many of the tracks on the album were recorded in Malibu.

Kreviazuk suggested Maida produce songs for the album, an ability Lavigne did not possess. Maida produced five songs, including "Fall to Pieces", which he co-wrote with Lavigne. Lavigne also invited two other producers: Don Gilmore, who produced three songs, two of which were written by Lavigne and Kreviazuk, and Butch Walker who also produced three songs in three days. Lavigne also co-wrote one track, "Nobody's Home", with Ben Moody, formerly of Evanescence, and the rest with her guitarist Evan Taubenfeld.

On her website, Lavigne states that she had learned a lot since her first record, Let Go: "I was involved in every aspect of making this record. I'm very hands-on. I knew how I wanted the drums, the guitar tones, and the structures to be. I understand the whole process so much better this time because I've been through it. I'm really picky with my sound." Regarding the album's theme, Lavigne stated, "I've gone through so much, so that's what I talk about....Like boys, like dating or relationships".

== Composition and lyrics ==
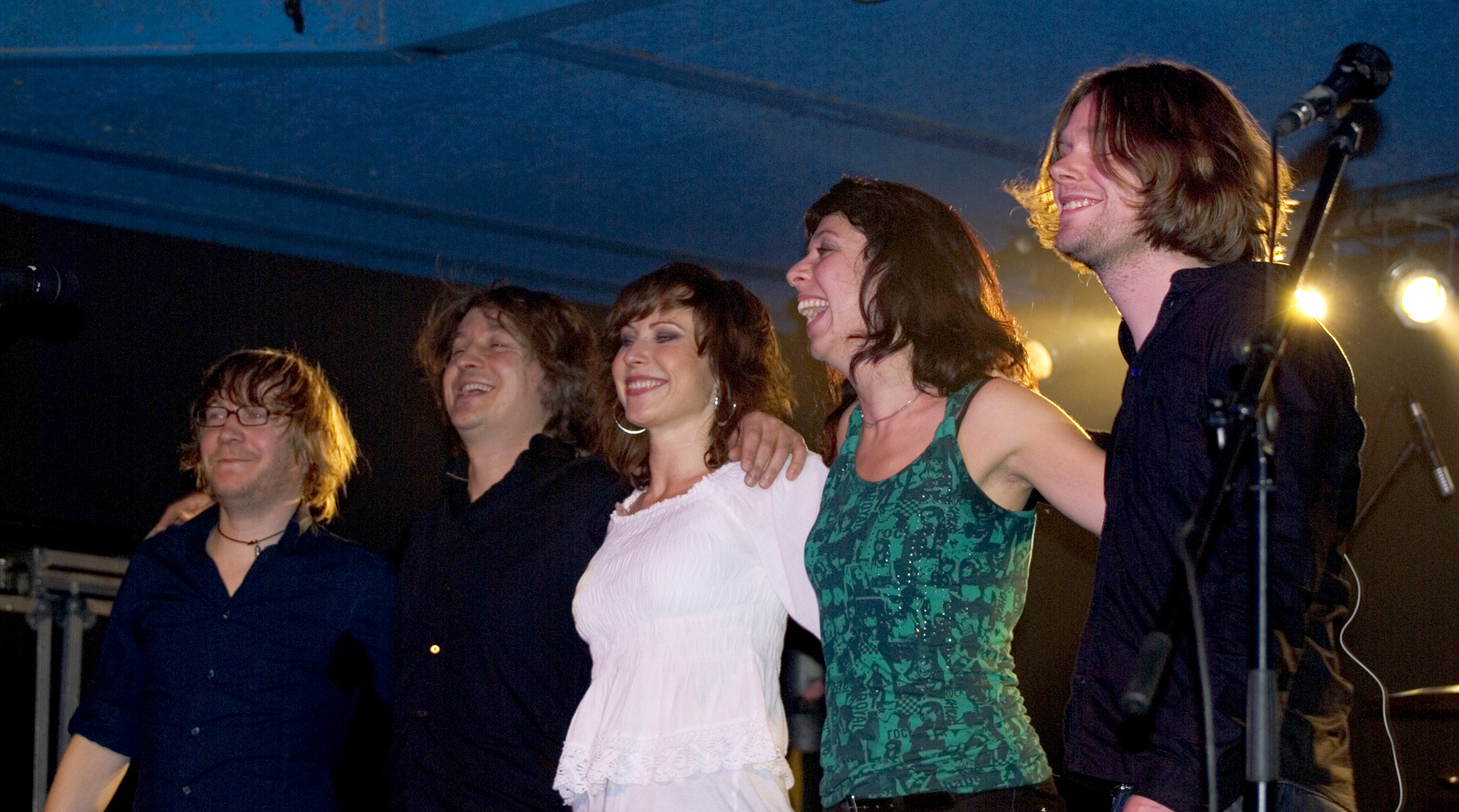
Under My Skin has been compared to Dutch rock band the Gathering

Under My Skin is a departure from the upbeat pop-punk of Lavigne's debut studio album, Let Go, and most of her discography. The album has more melodic rock songs and a darker post-grunge, alternative rock, and nu metal sound, with elements of emo, gothic rock, grunge and pop metal. Matt Cibula of Music Critic compared the album to Dutch rock band the Gathering and Swedish heavy metal. Other reviewers noted similarities with Evanescence, Limp Bizkit and Nickelback.

Like its predecessor, Under My Skin is heralded as a pop-punk gem from the early 2000s, even if "He Wasn't" is the only song usually classified as such. Lyrically, it is also darker than Lavigne's other albums, bar Goodbye Lullaby, with more mature and personal topics to her, such as the passing of her grandfather during her first headlining tour, and her relationship with Sum 41’s Deryck Whibley. The album also anticipated the emotional intensity and theatrical aesthetics of emo pop, allowing bands, such as Fall Out Boy and My Chemical Romance, to see mainstream success later in the decade.

The lead single, "Don't Tell Me", is a grunge song with folk rock verses and a hard rock chorus, reminiscent of Alanis Morissette. The lyrics discuss how pressured girls can be, especially in high school, to have sex with men, often after a date. The second and most successful single, "My Happy Ending", is seen as a counter to "Sk8er Boi", from Let Go, depicting a relationship that ended badly after a happy beginning. "Nobody's Home" has a darker topic, as the song describes a young girl who ran away from home, living rough, and couldn’t return to her broken family.

"He Wasn’t" is a pop-punk song which was never released as a single in the U.S. While continuing the themes of relationships and disappointing exes, it is the most radio-friendly song on the album, foreshadowing the direction that Lavigne took on her next record, The Best Damn Thing (2007). The closing track, "Slipped Away", is written in honor of Lavigne's grandfather, who she never got to say goodbye to because of her tour.

== Release and singles ==
Under My Skin was released on May 12, 2004, in Japan and later on May 25, 2004, in the United States and worldwide. Lavigne released four official singles from the album, and two promotional singles.

- "Don't Tell Me" was the first single from the album, written by Lavigne and Evan Taubenfeld and produced by Butch Walker. It earned Lavigne a nomination at the 2004 MTV VMAs, and charted at number 22 in the Billboard Hot 100, number five in the UK Singles Charts and the top 10 in Australia.
- "My Happy Ending" was the second single; it was written by Lavigne alongside its producer Butch Walker. The song returned Under My Skin to number one in Canada for several weeks, and to the top five in Germany, the UK, Australia, and other European countries. It was Lavigne's fourth number one single on the US Mainstream Top 40 and was her second platinum single since "Complicated" (2002). The song became a worldwide hit.
- "Nobody's Home" was the third single released from the album, written by Lavigne and former Evanescence member Ben Moody and produced by Don Gilmore. The song peaked lower in most countries than some of her previous singles.
- "He Wasn't" was the fourth single from the album, written by Lavigne and Chantal Kreviazuk and produced by Raine Maida. Despite charting in several countries, it was not a significant hit, failing to reach the top 20 in most markets. It was not released in the United States, where "Fall to Pieces" was released instead.
- "Fall to Pieces" was released in North America on April 18, 2005.

=== Other songs ===
- "Take Me Away" was also a radio-only single first released in Canada and later in Australia. In Canada, it was a promotional single preceding "Don't Tell Me".

== Critical reception ==
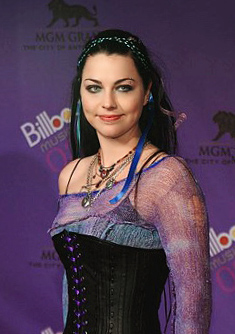
Critics compared the musical style of Under My Skin with Amy Lee of the American rock band Evanescence.

Professional ratings
Aggregate scores
Source	Rating
Metacritic	65/100
Review scores
Source	Rating
AllMusic	4/5 stars
Blender	4/5 stars
Entertainment Weekly	B
The Guardian	2/5 stars
PopMatters	3/5 stars
Q	4/5 stars
Rolling Stone	3.5/5 stars
Slant Magazine	2.5/5 stars
Yahoo! Music	6/10

According to Metacritic, Under My Skin received an average rating of 65, reflecting a positive reception from critics.. David Browne of Entertainment Weekly suggested that in the album, "Lavigne has become even more, well, complicated", noting she "sounds more burdened". Browne adds, "As contrived as the results can be, there's no denying the level of craft at work." Sal Cinquemani of Slant magazine noted that Lavigne's sound was now much heavier and darker and compared her to Amy Lee of Evanescence, as did Browne. Carly Carioli of Blender magazine also agreed, stating "she has deepened and darkened her sound without sacrificing her platinum-plated melodies". Kelefa Sanneh of Rolling Stone praised Lavigne's vocals, "blankness is what makes her best songs so irresistible. Whether it's a fit of faux punk or a maudlin ballad, she sings it all absolutely straight". Musically the album's sound is compared to "that of crunching punk guitars playing mighty power chords, all mixed with the same flawless elan that has characterized pop-punk ever since Green Day dropped Dookie" says Tim O'Neil of PopMatters. Andrew Strickland of Yahoo! Music agreed, "the girl can use those tiny lungs to great effect...she knows when to croon and when to yell".

On a more mixed note, Stephen Thomas Erlewine of AllMusic wrote that the album is "a bit awkward, sometimes sounding tentative and unsure, sometimes clicking and surging on Avril's attitude and ambition." Erlewine compared Lavigne to Canadian singer-songwriter Alanis Morissette. Cinquemani cited Lavigne's lyrics as her "biggest weakness" and Strickland agreed, stating, "we have a maturing Ms Lavigne, distancing herself from the teen antics of her "Let Go" debut, but struggling to find any stories worth telling". Tim O'Neil of PopMatters stated "Lavigne's songwriting on the bulk of Under My Skin just seems rote" and goes on to call Under My Skin "a good, if slightly disappointing, follow-up". The Guardian's Alexis Petridis lambasted the album, calling it a "flesh-eating virus" and criticised the lyrics, stating "the music is so anodyne that you don't pay much attention to Lavigne's lyrics. This proves to be a small mercy". Under My Skin is included in an article about Petridis' worst reviewed albums of modern times.

=== Rankings ===
Key
†	Indicates non-competitive categories

Year	Organization	Category	Result	Ref.
2020	Alternative Press	Best 2004 Scene (Emo/Pop-Punk) Albums †	Included	

=== Accolades ===
Awards for Under My Skin
Year	Organization	Award	Result	Ref.
2004	Hong Kong Top Sales Music Awards	Top Ten Best Selling Foreign Albums	Won	
2004	Premios Oye!	Main English Record of the Year	Won	
2005	Hungarian Music Awards	Foreign Modern Rock Album of the Year	Nominated	
2005	Japan Gold Disc Awards	Rock & Pop Album of the Year	Won	
2005	Juno Awards	Album of the Year	Nominated	
2005	Juno Awards	Pop Album of the Year	Won	
2005	RTHK International Pop Poll Awards	The Best Selling English Album	Won	

== Commercial performance ==
Under My Skin debuted at number one on the US Billboard 200, selling 381,000 copies in its first week. This feat marked Lavigne's highest first-week sales of her career and also her first number-one album, It also topped the US Billboard Internet Albums chart, it spent 66 weeks on the US Billboard 200 chart. The album was certified double Platinum by the Recording Industry Association of America (RIAA) in November 2004; by January 2006 it was certified triple Platinum. The album was ranked at number 22 in the year-end chart of the Billboard 200 in 2004 and at number 68 in 2005. As of September 2015, Under My Skin has sold 3.2 million copies in the US.

In Canada, Under My Skin debuted at number one on the Billboard Canadian Albums chart with sales of 63,000 copies, it spent 22 weeks on the chart. It was certified 5× Platinum in Canada with 500,000 copies sold, In the United Kingdom, the album debuted at number one on the UK Albums (OCC) with sales of 87,500 copies, it spent 37 weeks on the chart. It was certified 2× Platinum in the UK with sales of 600,000 copies sold. In Japan the album debuted at number one on the Japanese Albums (Oricon) chart with sales of 286,894 copies, and was certified Million in Japan with sales of 1 million copies sold making it the best selling album in the country by a female Canadian singer, and also number one in Australia, Spain, Mexico, Taiwan and Germany. In New Zealand the album debuted at number seven on the New Zealand Albums (RMNZ) and spent five months on the chart and was certified Gold in the country. On April 15, 2007, the album re-entered the UK Albums Chart at number 60. Worldwide, Under My Skin had sold 10 million copies.

== Promotional tours ==
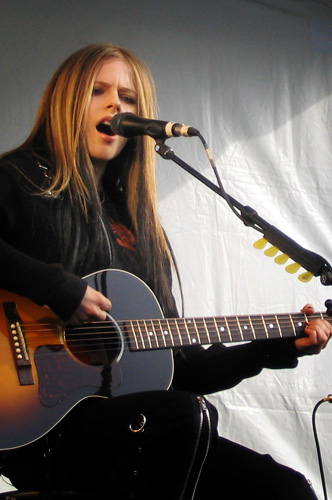
Lavigne at Eaton Centre Metrotown mall during her "Live By Surprise" promotional tour in 2004

To promote Under My Skin, Lavigne went on the "Live and by Surprise Tour", a 21-city mall tour in the United States and Canada. The venue in each city wasn't announced until 48 hours before the show, which began on March 5, 2004, in Milwaukee, Wisconsin, the week "Don't Tell Me" was released to radio. Accompanied by her guitarist Evan Taubenfeld, Lavigne performed a short live acoustic version of five songs from the album. The set also included "Sk8er Boi" from Let Go. Selections of this tour were released on the Live Acoustic EP, which was released exclusively in Target stores.

=== Bonez Tour ===
To further promote the album, Lavigne embarked on a world concert tour during 2004 and 2005. The Bonez Tour visited North America, Europe, Asia, Africa and Latin America. The 140-show tour began on September 26, 2004, and ended one year later on September 25, 2005. Opening acts for the concerts included Simple Plan and Butch Walker. At some shows, Lavigne covered songs such as "American Idiot" by Green Day and "All the Small Things" by Blink-182. The live performance at the Budokan Stadium was recorded on the DVD Bonez Tour 2005: Live at Budokan, which was only made available in Japan.

== Track listing ==
No.	Title	Lyrics	Music	Production	Length
1.	"Take Me Away"	Avril Lavigne	Evan Taubenfeld	Don Gilmore	2:57
2.	"Together"	Lavigne; Chantal Kreviazuk	Lavigne; Kreviazuk	Gilmore	3:14
3.	"Don't Tell Me"	Lavigne	Lavigne, Taubenfeld	Butch Walker	3:21
4.	"He Wasn't"	Lavigne; Kreviazuk	Lavigne; Kreviazuk	Raine Maida	2:59
5.	"How Does It Feel"	Lavigne; Kreviazuk	Lavigne; Kreviazuk	Maida	3:44
6.	"My Happy Ending"	Lavigne; Walker	Lavigne; Walker	Walker	4:02
7.	"Nobody's Home"	Lavigne	Lavigne; Ben Moody	Gilmore	3:32
8.	"Forgotten"	Lavigne; Kreviazuk	Lavigne; Kreviazuk	Gilmore	3:16
9.	"Who Knows"	Lavigne; Kreviazuk	Lavigne; Kreviazuk	Maida	3:30
10.	"Fall to Pieces"	Lavigne; Maida	Lavigne; Maida	Maida	3:28
11.	"Freak Out"	Lavigne	Taubenfeld; Matt Brann	Walker	3:11
12.	"Slipped Away"	Lavigne; Kreviazuk	Lavigne; Kreviazuk	Maida	3:33
Total length:					40:47

Special edition bonus tracks
No.	Title	Writer(s)	Length
13.	"Nobody's Home" (live)	Lavigne; Moody	3:20
14.	"Take Me Away" (live)	Lavigne; Taubenfeld	2:55
15.	"He Wasn't" (live)	Lavigne; Kreviazuk	3:13
16.	"Tomorrow" (live)	Lavigne; Curtis Frasca; Sabelle Breer	3:35
Total length:			53:50

United Kingdom reissue, 2010 digital reissue and 2024 vinyl reissue bonus track
No.	Title	Lyrics	Music	Production	Length
13.	"I Always Get What I Want"	Lavigne; Clif Magness	Lavigne; Magness	Magness	2:31
Total length:					43:18

Japanese bonus tracks
No.	Title	Lyrics	Music	Production	Length
13.	"I Always Get What I Want"	Lavigne; Clif Magness	Lavigne; Magness	Magness	2:31
14.	"Nobody's Home" (live acoustic)	Lavigne	Lavigne; Moody	Gilmore	3:38
Total length:					46:56

Japanese special edition bonus tracks
No.	Title	Writer(s)	Length
15.	"Nobody's Home" (live)	Lavigne; Moody	3:20
16.	"Take Me Away" (live)	Lavigne; Taubenfeld	2:55
17.	"He Wasn't" (live)	Lavigne; Kreviazuk	3:13
18.	"Tomorrow" (live)	Lavigne; Frasca; Breer	3:35
Total length:			59:59

Special edition bonus DVD
No.	Title	Length
1.	"Under My Skin Diary"
2.	"Bonez Tour Diary"
3.	"Don't Tell Me" (video)
4.	"My Happy Ending" (video)
5.	"Nobody's Home" (video)
6.	"He Wasn't" (video)

DualDisc edition bonus DVD
No.	Title	Length
1.	"Entire album in enhanced stereo" (standard edition tracks - 16-bit/48kHz)
2.	"Behind the scenes"
3.	"Don't Tell Me" (video)
4.	"My Happy Ending" (video)
5.	"Nobody's Home" (video)

== Personnel ==
Credits adapted from the liner notes of Under My Skin.

Musicians

- Avril Lavigne – lead vocals, background vocals, guitar (12)
- Kenny Aronoff – percussion (6, 10), drums (6, 10)
- Josh Freese – drums (1, 8)
- Victor Lawrence – cello (5, 12)
- Butch Walker – acoustic guitar (6), bass (3, 6, 11), percussion (3, 11), piano (6), electric guitar (3, 6, 11), keyboards (3), background vocals (3)
- Michael Ward – guitar (1–2, 8)
- Patrick Warren – strings (6), keyboards (6), Chamberlin (6)
- Phil X – guitar (4–5, 9–10)
- Brooks Wackerman – drums (2, 7)
- Raine Maida – keyboards (5, 9), guitar (10, 12)
- Chantal Kreviazuk – piano (2), keyboards (5)
- Mike Elizondo – bass (4)
- Brian Garcia – percussion (4–5, 10, 12)
- Sam Fisher – violin (5)
- Samuel Formicola – violin (12)
- Mark Robertson – violin (5, 12)
- Kenny Cresswell – drums (3)
- Shanti Randall – viola (5)
- Jason Lader – bass (5, 9–10, 12)
- Bill Lefler – drums (4–5, 9, 12)
- Static – keyboards (2)
- Jon O'Brien – keyboards (1, 7–8)
- Nick Lashley – guitar (10)
- Evan Taubenfeld – acoustic guitar (3, 11), drums (11), electric guitar (3, 11), background vocals (3, 11)
- Ben Moody – guitar (7)
- Alma Fernandez – viola (12)

Production

- Avril Lavigne – string arrangements (5)
- David Campbell – string arrangements (7)
- Don Gilmore – production (1–2, 7–8)
- Tom Lord-Alge – mixing (3–7, 9–12)
- Randy Staub – mixing (1–2, 8)
- Butch Walker – programming (3, 6, 11), producer (3, 6, 11)
- Raine Maida – producer (4–5, 9–10, 12), digital editing (5, 9, 12), string arrangements (5, 12)
- Chantal Kreviazuk – string arrangements (5, 12)
- John Rummen – art direction, design
- Leon Zervos – mastering
- Brian Garcia – digital editing (4–5, 9–10, 12)
- Dan Certa – additional engineering (1–2, 7–8), editing (1–2, 7–8)
- Kim Kinakin – art direction, design
- Jason Lader – programming (5, 9–10, 12), digital editing (4–5, 9–10, 12)
- Dan Chase – Pro Tools engineering (6)
- Jon O'Brien – programming (1–2, 7–8)
- Static – programming (2)
- Christie Priode – production coordinator (6, 11)

== Charts ==
=== Weekly charts ===
Weekly chart performance for Under My Skin
Chart (2004)	Peak position
Argentine Albums (CAPIF)	1
Australian Albums (ARIA)	1
Austrian Albums (Ö3 Austria)	1
Belgian Albums (Ultratop Flanders)	5
Belgian Albums (Ultratop Wallonia)	6
Canadian Albums (Billboard)	1
Czech Albums (ČNS IFPI)	11
Danish Albums (Hitlisten)	24
Dutch Albums (Album Top 100)	13
European Albums (Billboard)	1
Finnish Albums (Suomen virallinen lista)	14
French Albums (SNEP)	4
German Albums (Offizielle Top 100)	1
Greek Albums (IFPI)	1
Hungarian Albums (MAHASZ)	7
Irish Albums (IRMA)	1
Italian Albums (FIMI)	3
Japanese Albums (Oricon) (Note: The standard edition peaked at number one on the Japanese chart, while the special edition peaked at number 17.)	1
New Zealand Albums (RMNZ)	7
Norwegian Albums (VG-lista)	11
Polish Albums (ZPAV)	13
Portuguese Albums (AFP)	3
Scottish Albums (Official Charts)	2
Singaporean Albums (RIAS)	1
South African Albums (RISA)	2
Spanish Albums (PROMUSICAE)	1
Swedish Albums (Sverigetopplistan)	14
Swiss Albums (Schweizer Hitparade)	2
Taiwanese Albums (Five Music)	2
UK Albums (Official Charts)	1
US Billboard 200	1

=== Year-end charts ===
2004 year-end chart performance for Under My Skin
Chart (2004)	Position
Australian Albums (ARIA)	36
Austrian Albums (Ö3 Austria)	13
Belgian Albums (Ultratop Flanders)	51
Belgian Albums (Ultratop Wallonia)	34
Dutch Albums (Album Top 100)	80
European Albums (Billboard)	8
French Albums (SNEP)	57
German Albums (Offizielle Top 100)	14
Hungarian Albums (MAHASZ)	72
Italian Albums (FIMI)	30
Japanese Albums (Oricon)	8
New Zealand Albums (RMNZ)	48
Swedish Albums (Sverigetopplistan)	79
Swiss Albums (Schweizer Hitparade)	13
UK Albums (OCC)	31
US Billboard 200	22
Worldwide Albums (IFPI)	5

2005 year-end chart performance for Under My Skin
Chart (2005)	Position
German Albums (Offizielle Top 100)	92
Italian Albums (FIMI)	87
US Billboard 200	68

=== Decade-end charts ===
Decade-end chart performance for Under My Skin
Chart (2000–2009)	Position
Japanese Albums (Oricon)	92
US Billboard 200	149

== Certifications and sales ==
Certifications and sales for Under My Skin
Region	Certification	Certified units/sales
Argentina (CAPIF)	2× Platinum	80,000^{^}
Australia (ARIA)	Platinum	70,000^{^}
Austria (IFPI Austria)	Platinum	30,000^{*}
Belgium (BRMA)	Gold	25,000^{*}
Brazil (Pro-Música Brasil)	Platinum	125,000^{*}
Canada (Music Canada)	5× Platinum	500,000^{^}
France (SNEP)	Gold	100,000^{*}
Germany (BVMI)	Gold	100,000^{^}
Greece (IFPI Greece)	Gold	10,000^{^}
Japan (RIAJ)	Million	1,000,000^{^}
Mexico (AMPROFON)	Platinum	100,000^{^}
New Zealand (RMNZ)	Gold	7,500^{^}
Portugal (AFP)	Silver	10,000^{^}
Russia (NFPF)	Platinum	20,000^{*}
Singapore (RIAS)	Gold	5,000^{*}
Spain (Promusicae)	Gold	50,000^{^}
South Korea	—	66,514
Switzerland (IFPI Switzerland)	Platinum	40,000^{^}
United Kingdom (BPI)	2× Platinum	670,000
United States (RIAA)	3× Platinum	3,200,000
Summaries
Europe (IFPI)	Platinum	1,000,000^{*}
Worldwide	—	10,000,000
^{*} Sales figures based on certification alone.^{^} Shipments figures based on certification alone.
