= Avril Lavigne: My World =

Live album by Avril Lavigne
- Released: November 4, 2003
- Recorded: May 18, 2003
- Venue: HSBC Arena (Buffalo, New York)
- Length: 68:35
- Label: Arista
- Director: Hamish Hamilton
- Producer: Done and Dusted

Avril Lavigne chronology
Let Go (2002)	Avril Lavigne: My World (2003)	Under My Skin (2004)

Avril Lavigne video chronology
Avril Lavigne: My World (2003)	Bonez Tour 2005: Live at Budokan (2005)

Avril Lavigne: My World is the first live album/DVD by Canadian singer-songwriter Avril Lavigne, released on November 6, 2003. The DVD consists of 16 songs that Lavigne performed on her first live performance tour, the Try to Shut Me Up Tour at HSBC Arena in Buffalo, New York. Most of the tracks are taken from her debut album, Let Go, while two of the songs are covers. It also features one B-side song. On the live CD, three songs are covers and one is a single.

== Critical reception ==
Holly E. Ordway from DVD Talk website commented positively on Lavigne’s performance, stating that Lavigne “moves from one song to the next with minimal fuss, focusing her concert performance on her music rather than putting on an ‘act’ in general”. The audio quality of the DVD was assessed as unsatisfyingly monaural, less immersive than Lavigne's CDs. Ordway was critical of the bonus features on the DVD, believing that they would only interest a “devoted teenage fan”.

== Track listing ==
Taken from the back casing of Avril Lavigne: My World US DVD release.

Avril Lavigne: My World – Standard edition (DVD)
No.	Title	Writer(s)	Length
1.	"Sk8er Boi"	Lauren Christy; Scott Spock; Graham Edwards; Avril Lavigne
2.	"Nobody's Fool"	Peter Zizzo; Lavigne
3.	"Mobile"	Lavigne; Clif Magness
4.	"Anything but Ordinary"	Christy; Spock; Edwards; Lavigne
5.	"Losing Grip"	Lavigne; Magness
6.	"Naked"	Lavigne; Curtis Frasca; Sabelle Breer
7.	"Too Much to Ask"	Lavigne; Magness
8.	"I Don't Give"	Christy; Spock; Edwards; Lavigne
9.	"Basketcase"	Billie Joe Armstrong; Frank Wright; Michael Pritchard
10.	"My World"	Lavigne; Magness
11.	"I'm with You"	Christy; Spock; Edwards; Lavigne
12.	"Complicated"	Christy; Spock; Edwards; Lavigne
13.	"Unwanted"	Lavigne; Magness
14.	"Tomorrow"	Lavigne; Frasca; Breer
15.	"Knockin' on Heaven's Door"	Bob Dylan
16.	"Things I'll Never Say"	Christy; Spock; Edwards; Lavigne
Total length:			68:35

Avril Lavigne: My World – Bonus features
No.	Title	Length
1.	"Avril’s Cut (Behind-the-scenes featurette)"	38:51
2.	"Outtakes"	2:17
3.	"Photo Gallery"
4.	"Complicated" (Music video)	4:14
5.	"I’m with You" (Music video)	3:44
6.	"Knockin’ on Heaven’s Door" (Music video)	2:48
7.	"Losing Grip" (Music video)	3:54
8.	"Sk8er Boi" (Music video)	3:38
Total length:		59:25

Avril Lavigne: My World – Deluxe edition (bonus CD)/Avril Lavigne: My World digital EP
No.	Title	Writer(s)	Length
1.	"Fuel" (Live at the MTV Icon - May 2003)	James Hetfield; Lars Ulrich; Kirk Hammett	3:38
2.	"Basketcase" (Live at the Point, Dublin, Ireland - March 2003)	Armstrong; Wright; Pritchard	3:04
3.	"Unwanted" (Live at the Point, Dublin, Ireland - March 2003)	Lavigne; Magness	4:20
4.	"Sk8er Boi" (Live at the Point, Dublin, Ireland - March 2003)	Christy; Spock; Edwards; Lavigne	4:09
5.	"Knockin' on Heaven's Door" (Live at HSBC Arena, Buffalo, NY - May 18, 2003)	Dylan	3:08
6.	"Why"	Zizzo; Lavigne	3:59
Total length:			22:19

== Personnel ==
Credits adapted from Avril Lavigne: My World DVD liner notes.

- Avril Lavigne – vocals, guitar
- Evan Taubenfeld – lead guitar
- Mathew Braunn – drums
- Jesse Colburn – guitar
- Charles Moniz – bass guitar
- Brent Muhle – Nettmedia
- John Stavropolous – Nettmedia
- Tomas Larsson – Nettmedia
- Maria Gililova – Nettmedia
- Bill Harris – Nettmedia
- Jason Rosenthal – Nettmedia
- Mark Ashkinos – Scream DVD
- Jason Wishnow – Scream DVD
- Rodney Ascher – Scream DVD
- Travis Oscarson – Scream DVD
- Marc Bachli – Fini Films Inc.
- Shamus Hewitt – 369 Productions, documentary, DVD photos
- Hamish Hamilton – director
- Done and Dusted – producer
- Shauna Gold – manager
- Dan Garnett – tour manager
- Paul Runnals – production manager
- Hugo Rempel – production assistant
- Craig "Fin" Finley – tour accountant
- Shannon Reddy – personal assistant
- Joe Self – head security
- Brent Pollock – venue security
- Dave Heard – rigger
- Graeme Nicol – lighting director
- Mark LeCorre – FOH engineer
- Dave Pallett – monitor engineer
- George Widule – backline tech
- Martin Brown – backline tech
- Bippin Sammy – head carpenter
- Ken Hollands – carpenter
- Dale Lynch – lighting crew chief
- Terry Mueller – lighting system tech
- Ryan Kell – automation system tech
- Dave Retson – audio crew chief
- Jamie Howieson – audio FOH tech
- Shaun Racette – audio system tech
- Bill Crooks – video director/crew chief
- Barrie Roney – video system tech
- Dave Franzen – camera operator
- Will Craig – camera operator
- Mikee Cusack – merchandise
- Brian Eaton – merchandise
- Marty Kell – merchandise
- Glenn Jones – bus driver
- JP Newton – bus driver
- Steve Headley – bus driver
- Herb Colledge – bus driver
- Al Smith – lead truck driver
- Mike Love – truck driver
- Aaron Scheidt – truck driver
- Norm Bailey – truck driver
- Perry Manzuk – truck driver
- Jeffrey Schulz – DVD cover design
- Kim Kinakin – DVD package design
- Kharen Hill – cover photo, DVD photos
- David Leyes – backcover photos, inside photos, DVD photos
- Steve Jennings – backcover photos, DVD photos
- Fryderyk Gabowicz – backcover photos, DVD photos
- Cline – DVD photos

== Charts ==
=== Weekly charts ===
Weekly chart performance for "My World"
Chart (2003)	Peak position
German Albums (Offizielle Top 100)	46
Italian Albums (FIMI)	69
Portuguese Albums (AFP)	23
Swiss Albums (Schweizer Hitparade)	84

== Certifications ==
DVD

Region	Certification	Certified units/sales
Argentina (CAPIF)	Platinum	8,000^{^}
Australia (ARIA)	Platinum	15,000^{^}
Brazil (Pro-Música Brasil)	Platinum	60,000^{*}
Canada (Music Canada)	7× Platinum	70,000^{^}
Japan (RIAJ)	Gold	100,000^{^}
United Kingdom (BPI)	Gold	25,000^{*}
^{*} Sales figures based on certification alone.^{^} Shipments figures based on certification alone.

== Awards ==
Year	Awards ceremony	Award	Results
2004	Juno Awards	Best DVD of the Year	Nominated
