= Nobody's Home (Avril Lavigne song) =

2004 single by Avril Lavigne

Single by Avril Lavigne

from the album Under My Skin
- B-side: "I Always Get What I Want"; "Knockin' on Heaven's Door"
- Released: October 25, 2004
- Studio: NRG (Hollywood, California)
- Genre: Alternative rock; emo
- Length: 3:32
- Label: Arista; BMG; RCA
- Composers: Avril Lavigne; Ben Moody
- Lyricist: Avril Lavigne
- Producer: Don Gilmore

Avril Lavigne singles chronology
"My Happy Ending" (2004)	"Nobody's Home" (2004)	"He Wasn't" (2005)

Music video
- "Nobody's Home" on YouTube

"Nobody's Home" is the third single released from Canadian singer-songwriter Avril Lavigne's second studio album, Under My Skin (2004). The track was written by Lavigne and former Evanescence guitarist Ben Moody, who also plays guitar on the song. "Nobody's Home", produced by Don Gilmore, is generally slower-paced than Lavigne's previous singles from Under My Skin.

The song was well-received critically and commercially, reaching number 41 on the US Billboard Hot 100 chart and peaking within the top 40 on the charts of Australia and nine European countries, including Austria, Greece, Ireland, and the United Kingdom. One of the song's B-sides, "I Always Get What I Want", was released as a single on the iTunes Store on October 31, 2004.

== Composition and lyrics ==
"Nobody's Home" is an alternative rock and emo song written by Avril Lavigne and Ben Moody, a former guitarist of Evanescence, and produced by Don Gilmore. Mike DeWald of RIFF Magazine described the song, along with the album's lead single, "Don't Tell Me", as having influences of post-grunge.

The lyrics are about a depressed girl and the problems on her mind. Lavigne has claimed the song was inspired by a friend she knew from high school, who was “on the wrong way." She finds herself in trouble but she cannot go home as there is nobody here as reflected through the lyrics: "She wants to go home, but nobody's home/It's where she lies, broken inside/With no place to go to dry her eyes/Broken inside."

== Chart performance ==
"Nobody's Home" reached number 41 on the US Billboard Hot 100, spending 17 weeks on the chart. It peaked higher in the UK and Australia, reaching number 24 in both countries; it was her lowest-charting UK single before "Hot" charted in 2007 and peaked at number 30.

== Critical reception ==
In an AOL Radio listener's poll, "Nobody's Home" was voted Lavigne's seventh-best song. Tim O'Neil of PopMatters implied that the song's title "should tell you that the dominant mood is one of anger and defensiveness." Kathryn Milewski of Live365 opines the song is better live, and is "just one of the many emo bops you can cry to on Under My Skin."

== Music video ==
Lavigne plays a troubled and homeless girl who runs away from home after problems with her parents.

The music video was filmed on July 29 and 30, 2004, in Los Angeles, California, directed by Diane Martel. The video of "Nobody's Home" premiered on October 20 on MTV's Total Request Live.

In the music video for "Nobody's Home", Lavigne plays a homeless teenager who appears to live street-to-street with a friend. She hitch-hikes by the side of a highway and tries playing the guitar on the street to try to earn money. She also tries to call someone on a payphone, but is rebuffed. A store manager kicks her out of his store, but she ends up going back into the store and is shown washing herself in a convenience store bathroom. Towards the end of the video, she is seen trying to get inside parked cars, eventually finding an unlocked one, during heavy rain. At the end of the video, the girl, with dirty clothes and messy hair, is shown with a tear rolling down her cheek. She then turns around and walks away as the camera fades out. The video is interspersed with sepia-toned shots of a more glamorous Lavigne wearing a dress with long, curled hair, singing the song with an orchestra behind her.

During the video, Lavigne wears a T-shirt with logo of Moscow and the Russian word "Москва."

=== References in the video ===
At the beginning of the video, one can see "A+D", for Lavigne's then-boyfriend, now ex-husband, Deryck Whibley. Next, in the bathroom scene where Lavigne is using the hand dryer, "A+D" can be seen inside a heart that is written on the bathroom wall. The other outcast runaway is real-life friend Monique, who also appeared as one of the young women in the "My Happy Ending" video.

== Track listings ==
Australian CD single
No.	Title	Length
1.	"Nobody's Home"	3:33
2.	"Nobody's Home" (live acoustic)	3:42
3.	"Knockin' on Heaven's Door"	2:51
4.	"I Always Get What I Want"	2:31

German and Taiwanese CD single
No.	Title	Length
1.	"Nobody's Home"	3:33
2.	"Nobody's Home" (live acoustic)	3:42
3.	"Knockin' on Heaven's Door"	2:51
4.	"I Always Get What I Want"	2:31
5.	"Nobody's Home" (video)	3:33

Japanese maxi-CD single
No.	Title	Length
1.	"Nobody's Home"	3:33
2.	"My Happy Ending" (live acoustic version)	3:56
3.	"Take Me Away" (live acoustic version)	2:55
4.	"Nobody's Home" (video)	3:33

UK CD1
No.	Title	Length
1.	"Nobody's Home"	3:33
2.	"Nobody's Home" (live acoustic)	3:42

UK CD2
No.	Title	Length
1.	"Nobody's Home"	3:33
2.	"Nobody's Home" (live acoustic)	3:42
3.	"Knockin' on Heaven's Door"	2:51
4.	"Nobody's Home" (video)	3:33

== Personnel ==
Personnel are adapted from the US promo CD liner notes and inlay.

- Avril Lavigne – words, music, vocals
- Ben Moody – music, guitar
- Jon O'Brien – keyboards, programming
- David Campbell – string arrangement
- Brooks Wackerman – drums
- Don Gilmore – production, recording
- Tom Lord-Alge – mixing
- Leon Zervos – mastering
- Kim Kinakin – artwork design
- James Minchin III – photography

== Charts ==
=== Weekly charts ===
Weekly chart performance for "Nobody's Home"
Chart (2004–2005)	Peak position
Australia (ARIA)	24
Austria (Ö3 Austria Top 40)	20
Belgium (Ultratip Bubbling Under Flanders)	1
Belgium (Ultratip Bubbling Under Wallonia)	7
Canada CHR/Pop Top 30 (Radio & Records)	2
Canada Hot AC Top 30 (Radio & Records)	1
CIS Airplay (TopHit)	75
European Hot 100 Singles (Billboard)	76
France (SNEP)	24
Germany (GfK)	29
Greece (IFPI)	11
Hungary (Rádiós Top 40)	30
Ireland (IRMA)	19
Japan (Oricon)	128
Netherlands (Dutch Top 40)	37
Netherlands (Single Top 100)	66
Russia Airplay (TopHit)	38
Scottish Singles Sales (Official Charts)	18
Switzerland (Schweizer Hitparade)	35
UK Singles (Official Charts)	24
US Billboard Hot 100	41
US Adult Contemporary (Billboard)	38
US Adult Pop Airplay (Billboard)	16
US Pop Airplay (Billboard)	13

=== Year-end charts ===
2004 year-end chart performance for "Nobody's Home"
Chart (2004)	Position
Russia Airplay (TopHit)	171

2005 year-end chart performance for "Nobody's Home"
Chart (2005)	Position
Brazil (Crowley)	83
US Adult Top 40 (Billboard)	48
US Mainstream Top 40 (Billboard)	57

== Certifications ==
Certifications for "Nobody's Home"
Region	Certification	Certified units/sales
Brazil (Pro-Música Brasil)	Platinum	60,000^{*}
Canada (Music Canada)	Gold	40,000^{‡}
United States (RIAA)	Gold	500,000^{*}
^{*} Sales figures based on certification alone.^{‡} Sales+streaming figures based on certification alone.

== Release history ==
Release dates and formats for "Nobody's Home"
Region	Date	Format	Label(s)	Ref.
United States	October 25, 2004	Contemporary hit radio	Arista	
Japan	November 4, 2004	CD	Arista; BMG; RCA	
Australia	November 15, 2004	CD	Arista; BMG; RCA	
United Kingdom	November 15, 2004	CD	Arista; BMG; RCA	
Germany	November 29, 2004	CD	Arista; BMG; RCA	
