= Take Me Away (Avril Lavigne song) =

Promotional single by Avril Lavigne

from the album Under My Skin
- A-side: "Don't Tell Me"
- Released: May 24, 2004
- Recorded: 2003
- Studio: NRG Studios, North Hollywood, California
- Genre: Heavy metal; nu metal
- Length: 2:57
- Label: Arista
- Songwriters: Avril Lavigne; Evan Taubenfeld
- Producer: Don Gilmore

"Take Me Away" is a song by Canadian singer-songwriter Avril Lavigne, released on May 24, 2004 as a promotional single from her second studio album Under My Skin. Written by herself and Evan Taubenfeld, and produced by Don Gilmore, the song is an example of the album's heavier sound, with elements of heavy metal.

The song started playing on Canadian rock radio in March 2004, at around the same time that the album's lead single, "Don't Tell Me", was being promoted. The song was also included as the B-side on the physical release of "Don't Tell Me" in many regions, and re-released digitally as a promotional single from the album on May 24, 2004.

"Take Me Away" received mixed reviews from music critics. Some critics complimented the composition and musical styles, whilst the rest criticized her songwriting and negatively compared it to the work of fellow Canadian artist Alanis Morissette.

== Background and release ==
"Take Me Away" was written by Avril Lavigne and Evan Taubenfeld, and was produced by Don Gilmore. It serves as the opening track to her second studio album Under My Skin (2004) and was first featured as a B-side of the album's lead single, "Don't Tell Me", CD single in many regions, including Australia, Japan and Europe.

On May 24, 2004, the track was re-released as a digital download on the iTunes Store as the promotional single for Under My Skin, which was released on the next day. The tracks "I Always Get What I Want" and "He Wasn't", which also appeared on the parent album, were also released digitally on the same date.

According to the Australasian Performing Right Association (APRA), Lavigne has recorded another song also titled "Take Me Away". It was written by Avril Lavigne and the music production team the Matrix (credited under all three members' name Graham Edwards, Scott Alspach and Lauren Christy). The Lavigne and Matrix track was originally meant to be on Lavigne's debut studio album, Let Go (2002), but didn't make the final track listing.

== Composition and lyrics ==
"Take Me Away" (2004)
A 30 second sample of "Take Me Away", conjuring metal with heaps of guitars and vocal overdubs.

"Take Me Away" has a duration of two minutes and fifty seven seconds, and is composed in the key of E minor. Set in time signature of common time, with a moderate tempo of 99 beats per minute, the song has a basic sequence of F♯m-C♯m-D–E as its chord progression, and features a vocal range spanning from B_{3} to D♯_{5}.

Lyrically, the song is an outcry from Lavigne being unable to handle the confusion and hoping someone will take her out of the chaos. Annabel Leathes of BBC Music compared the song to another ballad from Under My Skin, "My Happy Ending", since they both "pivot on the pain and despair of relationships going off the boil and, despite the stadium-rousing choruses."

== Reception ==
"Take Me Away" received generally mixed reviews by some critics. Annabel Leathes from BBC Music wrote that the song "pivot[s] on the pain and despair of relationships going off the boil and, despite the stadium-rousing choruses[, ...] Lavigne's whiney vocals and trite lyrics imply that madam is merely having a strop rather than wearing the hair shirt of Alanis Morissette-style suffering." Lance Fiasco from idobi Radio shared that "Take Me Away" and Lavigne's previous single, "Losing Grip", are the harder-edged hair-messers that really showed her grrl badge, demonstrating the once-poisonous sting of Alanis. Sal Cinquemani from Slant Magazine labelled "Take Me Away" a "head-banging" opening track from the album which conjured '80s metal with heaps of guitars and vocal overdubs.

Along with the release of Under My Skin, the musical style of "Take Me Away" was strongly compared with American rock band Evanescence. James R. Minchin III of Entertainment Weekly spoke out that Lavigne has transformed into a dour teen who seems to have spent way too much time listening to Evanescence. Sal Cinquemani of Slant Magazine noted that Lavigne's sound was now much heavier and darker and compared her to Amy Lee, the co-founder and lead vocalist of Evanescence.

== Live performances ==
Lavigne performed the acoustic version of "Take Me Away" at 2004 Sessions@AOL on February 29, 2004. The audio performance of the song was later included on Lavigne's fourth extended play, Avril Live Acoustic, which features other five audio performances at the concert and was released on July 1, 2004 by Arista Records.

The song also appeared on Lavigne's setlist for her worldwide tour, Bonez Tour (2004–05). The performance of "Take Me Away" during the tour at Nippon Budokan in Tokyo, Japan is included on Lavigne's second full-length DVD Bonez Tour 2005: Live at Budokan (2004). The DVD was released exclusively in Japan and was certified gold by the Recording Industry Association of Japan (RIAJ).

== Credits and personnel ==
Credits adapted from the liner notes of "Don't Tell Me" CD single.

Recording and management

- Recorded at NRG Studios (North Hollywood, California)
- Mixed at South Beach Studios (Miami Beach, Florida)
- Engineered at Ocean Way Recording (Los Angeles, United States)
- Distributed by BMG Australia Limited
- Published by Almo Music Corp. and Avril Lavigne Publishing Ltd.
- All rights administered by Arista Records, Inc.

Personnel

- Avril Lavigne – lead vocals, songwriting
- Evan Taubenfeld – songwriting
- Don Gilmore – production
- John O'Brien – programming, guitar, keyboards
- Michael Ward – guitar
- Dan Certa – engineering
- Fox Phelps – engineering [Assistant]
- Joshua Sarubin – artists and repertoire
- Kim Kinakin – art direction, design
- Randy Jones – coordinator
- Shauna Gold – management
- Terry McBride – management
- Cline – photography

== Release history ==
Release dates and formats for "Take Me Away"
| Region | Format | Date | Label | Ref. |
|---|---|---|---|---|
| France | Digital download | May 24, 2004 | Arista | |
| Israel | Digital download | May 24, 2004 | Arista | |
| United Kingdom | Digital download | May 24, 2004 | Arista | |
