= Matt Brann =

Canadian drummer (born 1980)

- Also known as: Dr. Space
- Born: 14 November 1980 (age 44); Ajax, Ontario, Canada
- Genres: Pop punk
- Occupation: Musician
- Instrument(s): Drums, percussion, vocals
- Years active: 1994–present

Matt Brann (born 14 November 1980) is a Canadian drummer, mainly known for his work with Avril Lavigne.

== Career ==
He started playing drums when he was 12, but it wasn't until when he attended Exeter High School that he started to play in a band called Second Opinion along with a few school friends (including Jason McCaslin, who would later go on to become the bassist of Canadian rock band Sum 41) at the age of 14. They played together for about 5 years around their local town and outside of Toronto, Ontario.

His first luck struck at 2002 when a friend of his who was on the same management as Avril Lavigne had just gotten signed and needed to put a band together. Matt called her management Nettwerk and they flew him to New York to meet her. He auditioned for the role of the drummer and successfully became part of Lavigne's band. Brann, alongside bandmates, Lavigne and guitarist Evan Taubenfeld, wrote the track "Freak Out" which appeared on Lavigne's second album, Under My Skin.

He also covered Blur's song "Song 2" for Avril Lavigne's Bonez Tour, for which Lavigne played the drums, while he contributed the vocals. After being in the 18-month Bonez world tour with Avril, which started in September 2004, he, along with the rest of the band, took a break whilst Lavigne pursued an acting career. During this time, Brann went back to the studio and worked with The New Cities with their albums.

He appeared in the video of "Makes No Difference" by Sum 41. He is the manager of Toronto-based band Organ Thieves which features Sum 41 guitarist Dave Baksh. He recorded and played live drums for The Operation M.D., a garage rock band featuring Jason McCaslin of Sum 41.
