= Fall to Pieces (Avril Lavigne song) =

2005 single by Avril Lavigne

Single by Avril Lavigne

from the album Under My Skin
- Released: April 18, 2005
- Studio: Whitecoat Sound, Satellite (Malibu, California); Ocean (Burbank, California)
- Genre: Rock
- Length: 3:28
- Label: RCA
- Songwriters: Avril Lavigne; Raine Maida
- Producer: Raine Maida

Avril Lavigne singles chronology
"He Wasn't" (2005)	"Fall to Pieces" (2005)	"Keep Holding On" (2006)

Audio video
- "Fall to Pieces" on YouTube

"Fall to Pieces" is a song by Canadian singer-songwriter Avril Lavigne from her second studio album, Under My Skin (2004). The song was written by Lavigne and was co-written and produced by Raine Maida. It was released April 18, 2005, as the fourth single from the album in North America and select European markets, while "He Wasn't" was released internationally.

== Composition ==
"Fall to Pieces" is a guitar-driven ballad set to a moderate rock tempo of 92 BPM. It was composed in the key of C major, with a vocal range of G3-E5.

== Chart performance ==
"Fall to Pieces" peaked at number 175 on the Russian Airplay Top 100 Chart. In the US, it reached number six on the Bubbling Under Hot 100 Singles chart and number 55 on the Billboard Pop 100, in addition to reaching numbers 18 and 34, respectively, on the Adult Top 40 and Mainstream Top 40 airplay charts. In Canada, "Fall to Pieces" reached number six on the Radio & Records CHR/Pop Top 30 chart and at number 4 on the magazine's Hot AC Top 30 chart.

== Personnel ==
Personnel are adapted from the "Fall to Pieces" promo CD liner notes.

- Avril Lavigne – writing, vocals
- Raine Maida – writing, production, guitar
- Tom Lord-Alge – mix engineering
- Femio Hernandez – assistant mixi engineering
- Leon Zervos – mastering at Sterling Sound (New York City)
- Brian Garcia – recording engineer, digital editing
- Jason Cupp – assistant recording engineer
- Jason Lader – digital editing, bass, programming
- Phil X – guitar
- Nick Lashley – guitar
- Kenny Aronoff – drums, percussion

== Charts ==
=== Weekly charts ===
Weekly chart performance for "Fall to Pieces"
Chart (2005)	Peak position
Canada CHR/Pop Top 30 (Radio & Records)	6
Canada Hot AC Top 30 (Radio & Records)	4
Ukraine Airplay (TopHit)	99
US Bubbling Under Hot 100 (Billboard)	6
US Adult Pop Airplay (Billboard)	18
US Pop Airplay (Billboard)	34
US Pop 100 (Billboard)	55

=== Year-end charts ===
Year-end chart performance for "Fall to Pieces"
Chart (2005)	Position
US Adult Top 40 (Billboard)	73
Venezuela (Record Report)	42

== Release history ==
Release dates and formats for "Fall to Pieces"
Region	Date	Format	Label	Ref.
United States	April 18, 2005	Contemporary hit radio	Arista	
United States	May 2, 2005	Hot adult contemporary radio	Arista	
