= He Wasn't =

2005 single by Avril Lavigne

Single by Avril Lavigne

from the album Under My Skin
- Released: March 28, 2005
- Studio: Whitecoat Sound (Malibu); The Boat (Los Angeles)
- Genre: Pop-punk; post-grunge
- Length: 2:59
- Label: Arista; RCA
- Songwriters: Avril Lavigne; Chantal Kreviazuk
- Producer: Raine Maida

Avril Lavigne singles chronology
"Nobody's Home" (2004)	"He Wasn't" (2005)	"Fall to Pieces" (2005)

Music video
- "He Wasn't" on YouTube

"He Wasn't" is a song by Canadian singer-songwriter Avril Lavigne, released on March 28, 2005, as the fourth and final single from her second studio album, Under My Skin (2004). The song was written by Lavigne and Chantal Kreviazuk, and produced by Raine Maida. "He Wasn't" was released as a single in Europe and Oceania and received airplay on Canadian radio. In the United States, "Fall to Pieces" was released as the fourth single instead.

== Composition and lyrics ==
"He Wasn't" is a faster and more upbeat take on the boyfriend "not being good enough" trope, as opposed to Lavigne's slower-paced songs from Under My Skin on the same matter. Alexis Petridis of The Guardian compared the song to the pop-punk of her debut album, Let Go (2002), specifically "Sk8er Boi". Chantal Kreviazuk described the song as "a super-fun, punk, screw-you-to-boys song," while AllMusic highlighted the song as one of the most significant in the post-grunge genre.

The song's lyrics are about an unsuccessful relationship between Lavigne and a man who appears to be treating her badly, such as not even opening the door to her. On a documentary of the making of the "My Happy Ending" music video, "He Wasn't" plays in the background and Lavigne jokes, "'He wasn't what I wanted'...is that a theme on my record?".

== Critical reception ==
"He Wasn't" was criticized for the shallowness of the lyrics. Sal Cinquemani of Slant magazine described the song as a "crappy faux-punk tune", mostly because of the lyrical content. David Browne of Entertainment Weekly described the song as a "bratty kiss-off" and labelled it "boardroom-approved mall punk" noting that it sounded similar to songs on Lavigne's first album, Let Go.

However, "He Wasn't" has also been praised for its loud, catchy nature; Stephen Thomas Erlewine of AllMusic describes the song as "the fastest, loudest, catchiest, and best song here, and the one closest to the spirit and sound of Let Go". He also highlighted the song as a 'track pick' in a review of the album, Under My Skin. Rolling Stone was positive "The album's best song, a raucous three-minute sprint called "He Wasn't," has a pretty vacant opening line ("There's not much going on today/I'm really bored") and a simple yet ambiguous chorus: "He wouldn't even open up the door/He never made me feel like I was special." but "The words are full of contempt and self-pity, but she sings them like she doesn't really care." Yahoo Music! wrote: ""He Wasn't" maintains this theme (broken relationship) with a dashing, Clash-style chorus that chastises this young man for not opening doors. Jeez, young women these days - one minute they're wearing stack-heeled DMs and fairy queen ra-ra skirts and the next they give you hell for not acting like your dad."

=== Accolades ===
Award/Publisher	Year	Category	Result	Ref.
AllMusic	2012	Most Significant Post-grunge Songs of All Time †	Longlisted	
MTV Video Music Brazil	2005	Best International Video	Nominated	

== Commercial performance ==
"He Wasn't" was not released as a single in the United States, instead "Fall to Pieces" was, but in the United Kingdom, the song debuted at No. 23 and spent four weeks on the chart. In Australia, it debuted at No. 25 and spent six weeks on the chart. The song was most successful on the Ultratip Bubbling Under charts in Belgium, peaking at No. 2 in both the regions of Flanders and Wallonia.

== Music video ==
=== Background ===
The music video was directed by American duo the Malloys in New York on December 13, 2004. The production duo previously worked on the music video for Lavigne's "Complicated" (2002). Members of Lavigne's backing band, including Evan Taubenfeld, are featured in the music video.

During the shooting of the music video when the pink slime came out, Lavigne tells that days later her hair was still pink and she needed to redye it because during the next days she was scheduled to have a photoshoot with Cosmopolitan and her hair was looking really messy and all pink.

=== Synopsis ===
Lavigne and her band destroy the instruments while pink paint is poured on them by several holes in the studio.

The video features Lavigne singing and her band playing instruments in the background. There are scenes where she dances around wearing white gloves, a pink skirt, and holding a magic wand (she is portraying a fairy), and other scenes where she is wearing devil horns on her head (she is portraying the devil). It turns out that Lavigne and her band are at a video shoot, and later get into a food fight, much to the dismay of the directors - who are played by Lavigne and the band, all dressed up in wigs and suits. Avril then rebels and smashes her guitar into the camera lens, and then into the paper wall, where pink paint splashes out. The video ends with the band dancing and Lavigne doing the splits.

== Live performances ==
The song was performed during the Bonez Tour (2004–2005) as the opening song of the concert tour. "He Wasn't" has subsequently been included on Lavigne's the Best Damn World Tour (2008), Black Star Tour (2011–2012), the Avril Lavigne Tour (2013–2014), and Head Above Water Tour (2019).

== Track listings and formats ==
- UK CD
1. "He Wasn't" – 2:59
2. "He Wasn't" (live version) – 3:16
3. "He Wasn't" (video)
4. "Video Diary"
- Australian CD
1. "He Wasn't" – 2:59
2. "He Wasn't" (live full band performance) – 3:13
3. "He Wasn't" (live acoustic version) – 3:16
4. "He Wasn't" (video)
- French CD
1. "He Wasn't" – 2:59
2. "He Wasn't" (live acoustic version) – 3:16

== Credits and personnel ==
Adapted from the "He Wasn't" CD single liner notes.

Studios

- Recorded at Whitecoat Sound (Malibu) and The Boat (Los Angeles)

Personnel

- Avril Lavigne – writing, lead vocals
- Chantal Kreviazuk – writing
- Phil X – guitar
- Mike Elizondo – bass
- Bill Lefler – drums
- Brian Garcia – percussion, recording, digital editing
- Raine Maida – producer
- Danny Kalb – recording assistance
- Bob Boyd – recording assistance
- Jason Lader – digital editing
- Tom Lord-Alge – mixing
- Femio Hernandez – mixing assistance

== Charts ==
Weekly chart performance for "He Wasn't"
Chart (2005)	Peak position
Australia (ARIA)	25
Austria (Ö3 Austria Top 40)	35
Belgium (Ultratip Bubbling Under Flanders)	2
Belgium (Ultratip Bubbling Under Wallonia)	2
Canada CHR/Pop Top 30 (Radio & Records)	17
Germany (GfK)	29
Ireland (IRMA)	35
Netherlands (Dutch Top 40 Tipparade)	9
Netherlands (Single Top 100)	99
New Zealand (Recorded Music NZ)	38
Scotland Singles (Official Charts)	25
Switzerland (Schweizer Hitparade)	43
UK Singles (Official Charts)	23

== Release history ==
Release dates and formats for "He Wasn't"
Region	Date	Format	Label	Ref.
United Kingdom	March 28, 2005	CD	Arista	
Australia	April 4, 2005	CD	Arista	
Germany	April 18, 2005	CD	Arista	
