= Evan Taubenfeld =

American musician

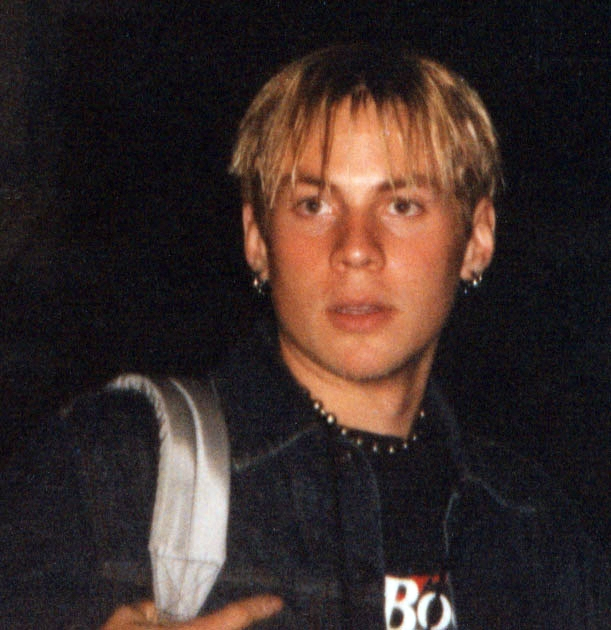
- Taubenfeld in 2003

Background information
- Born: Evan David Taubenfeld; June 27, 1983 (age 43); Baltimore, Maryland, U.S.
- Genres: Pop punk, pop rock, pop
- Occupations: Singer, musician, producer, executive music director
- Instruments: Vocals, guitar, piano, drums
- Years active: 2002–present
- Label: Sire/Warner Bros.
- Spouse: Nina Jordan (m. 2022)

Evan David Taubenfeld (born June 27, 1983) is an American singer and musician, best known for being Avril Lavigne's lead guitarist, music director and frequent collaborator. Taubenfeld's debut album, Welcome to the Blacklist Club, was released in 2010.

== Early life ==
Taubenfeld was born in Baltimore, Maryland, to Mark and Ami Taubenfeld, who ran a catering business. He has two siblings, a younger brother named Drew (b. 1984), who is a multi-instrumentalist and musical director for Kacey Musgraves, and a younger sister, Annie (b. 1990). He was raised Jewish. Taubenfeld graduated from McDonogh School in 2001.

Taubenfeld had an early interest in music and took an interest at the piano at home as a toddler. He received a small drum kit as a young child, continuing on a full-size drum kit several years later. While in seventh grade, he joined the band The Suburbanites on drums. At the age of 14, he taught himself guitar by learning to play "Come As You Are" by Nirvana. After 3 years, he founded Spinfire with his friend Matt Halpern in which he sang and played guitar. They performed at festivals and shows in the Baltimore area, and wrote and produced songs such as "Feeling Beautiful", "Lettin' It Be", and "Waiting."

== Career ==
=== With Avril Lavigne (2003–2011) ===
Taubenfeld considered studying at Berklee College of Music, but chose to market his band with major labels instead. When his band members chose to go to college instead, Taubenfeld recorded a demo of his own music, among others sending it to Arista Records A&R vice president Josh Sarubin, who he made his acquaintance with during his time in Spinfire. Taubenfeld received a phone call from Sarubin, who invited him to audition in New York City for the band of a new talent he just signed, a young Canadian named Avril Lavigne. He joined this band in 2002 when her debut album Let Go had already been recorded. For Lavigne's sophomore album Under My Skin, Taubenfeld contributed to the music and was credited for the music on "Don't Tell Me", "Take Me Away", and "Freak Out", the latter of which he shared the credits with drummer Matt Brann. In addition to being her lead guitarist, he took up music directing and became a close friend of Lavigne. He left the band in September 2004, when he was signed as a staff writer with EMI Music Publishing, after which he got his own recording contract with Sire/Warner Bros. Records in October 2004.

Taubenfeld would continue to collaborate with Lavigne for several more years. He co-wrote four songs with Lavigne on her 2007 album The Best Damn Thing, including the hit single "Hot". Additionally, he appeared in the music video for Lavigne's "Girlfriend", which also featured on The Best Damn Thing, appearing alongside Lavigne and her brother, Matt, in her backing band. In 2010, he performed "Complicated" and Girlfriend acoustically with Lavigne and her band member, Jim McGorman. On Goodbye Lullaby from 2011, he co-wrote three songs, performed vocals on the bridge of "Push", along with playing in several instruments, and doing engineering and producing work on the album. He subsequently was the opening act for Lavigne on the North American Leg her 2011 Black Star World Tour.

=== Solo career and other projects (2003–present) ===
In 2003, while still playing in Lavigne's band, Taubenfeld formed the band Ditch Ruxton, with whom he performed one show. The group disbanded within the year.

In 2008, Taubenfeld produced two tracks for rapper Tyga's debut album No Introduction, "Press 7" and another song "First Timers" which he sang the Chorus on. He also produced for The Pack and Oreskaband.

For his solo material, Taubenfeld set up his own band, named The Black List Club. His first solo single, "Boy Meets Girl", was released in March 2009. It was co-written with among others indie pop artists Adam Richman and Bleu. To promote the single, Taubenfeld toured with Metro Station, Mitchel Musso and Mayday Parade in July 2009. Taubenfeld's Christmas single, "Merry Swiftmas (Even Though I Celebrate Chanukah)" debuted in late 2009 at #59 on the Hot Country Songs chart, in which he besung Taylor Swift and Christmas years before Swift trademarked the term "Swiftmas". It would take until May 2010 until his album Welcome to the Blacklist Club was released. He has since continued to record and release songs, but not in album format.

Taubenfeld was the executive musical director for the short-lived MTV show Kaya, a scripted drama about a girl who gets signed to a major label with her band. He among others co-wrote, recorded and produced the soundtrack for the series. He also had a role on the Web series Private as Blake Pearson, and produced for the MTV series Pageant Place.

In 2012, Taubenfeld co-wrote the song "Shine" for The Used album Vulnerable. That same year, he produced for the Japanese band Stereopony, and collaborated with them on the song "Just Rock With Me", for which the collective was dubbed "Evanpony" in public releases of the song.

Taubenfeld presently runs Crush Music Publishing, a music publishing joint venture between Songs Publishing and Crush Management.

== Personal life ==
Taubenfeld married Nina Jordan on February 12, 2022.

== Discography ==
=== Studio albums ===
Title	Album details	Peak positions
Title	Album details	US Heat
Welcome to the Blacklist Club	Release date: May 18, 2010; Label: Sire/Reprise Records; Format: CD, digital download	41

=== Singles ===
List of singles, with selected chart positions, showing year released and album name
Title	Year	Peak chart positions	Album
Title	Year	US Country	Album
"Boy Meets Girl"	2009	—	Welcome to the Blacklist Club
"Merry Swiftmas (Even Though I Celebrate Chanukah)"	2009	59	non-album song
"Pumpkin Pie"	2010	—	Welcome to the Blacklist Club
"Best Years of Our Lives" (featuring Avril Lavigne)	2011	–	non-album song
"Claire"	2013	—	non-album song
"Still in Love Somehow"	2013	—	non-album song

== Filmography ==
=== Film ===
Year	Title	Role	Notes
2003	Avril Lavigne: My World	Himself	Lead Guitarist / Musical Director
2015	Flipped (a.k.a. Blood Rush)	Scotty Dee	Actor

=== Television ===
Year	Title	Role	Notes
2007	KAYA	Himself	Executive Musical Director
2009	Private	Blake Pearson	Missing in episodes 1 and 2
