= Mobile (song) =

2003 single by Avril Lavigne

Single by Avril Lavigne

from the album Let Go
- Released: May 2003
- Studio: Blue Iron Gate (Santa Monica)
- Genre: Pop rock
- Length: 3:31
- Label: Arista
- Songwriters: Avril Lavigne; Clif Magness
- Producer: Clif Magness

Avril Lavigne singles chronology
"Losing Grip" (2003)	"Mobile" (2003)	"Don't Tell Me" (2004)

Audio video
- "Mobile" on YouTube

"Mobile" is a song by Canadian singer-songwriter Avril Lavigne from her debut studio album, Let Go (2002). The song was written by Lavigne and Clif Magness, with production being helmed solely by Magness. In May 2003, the song was released in New Zealand as the fifth single from the album.

== Composition ==
According to the sheet music published at Musicnotes.com by Alfred Publishing, the pop rock song is written in the key of A major and is set in time signature of common time with a tempo of 100 beats per minute.

== Critical reception ==
Pat Blashill of Rolling Stone referred to "Mobile" as a "completely inescapable hit". He noted that "Lavigne wails over crashing waves of acoustic and electric guitars, her big voice occasionally turns sideways in a drawl, a casual hint that she may actually be, of all things, a fine country singer in the making".

== Chart performance ==
"Mobile" was solely released as a single in New Zealand. The song debuted at number 36 on the New Zealand Singles Chart for the issue dated May 11, 2003. It spent a total of 11 weeks on the chart, peaking at number 26 for the issue dated June 8, 2003.

== Music video ==
A music video was filmed for the song in December 2002, although it was shelved for unknown reasons. In January 2011, the music video leaked online.

== Credits and personnel ==
Credits and personnel adapted from the Let Go album liner notes.

- Avril Lavigne – writer, lead vocals
- Clif Magness – writer, producer, recording, guitars, bass, keyboards, programming
- Steve Gryphon – drum recording
- Tom Hardisty – drum recording assistant
- Tom Lord-Alge – mixing at South Beach Studios (Miami)
- Femio Hernandez – mixing assistant
- Josh Freese – drums

== Charts ==
Weekly chart performance for "Mobile"
Chart (2003)	Peak position
New Zealand (Recorded Music NZ)	26
