= My Happy Ending (song) =

2004 single by Avril Lavigne

- International single cover

Single by Avril Lavigne

from the album Under My Skin
- B-side: "Take It"
- Released: June 14, 2004
- Studio: Ruby Red Productions (Atlanta, Georgia); Ocean Way Recording (Hollywood, California)
- Genre: Post-grunge; alternative rock; power pop; emo-pop; grunge
- Length: 4:02
- Label: Arista; RCA
- Songwriters: Avril Lavigne; Butch Walker
- Producer: Butch Walker

Avril Lavigne singles chronology
"Don't Tell Me" (2004)	"My Happy Ending" (2004)	"Nobody's Home" (2004)

Alternative cover
- Japanese physical single cover

Music video
- "My Happy Ending" on YouTube

"My Happy Ending" is a song by Canadian singer-songwriter Avril Lavigne, written by herself and Butch Walker for her second studio album, Under My Skin (2004). Structurally, the song is written in 4/4 style and has a repeated hook in both the chorus and in the intro and outro.

Lavigne wanted "My Happy Ending" to be released as the album's lead single, but the label went with ''Don't Tell Me'' instead. It was then released as the second single in June 2004, becoming a top-five hit in Canada, the Czech Republic, and the United Kingdom while reaching the top 10 in seven other countries, including the United States, where it outperformed its predecessor by peaking at number nine for four weeks. The Recording Industry Association of America (RIAA) certified the single gold in November 2004.

== Composition ==
"My Happy Ending" is a post-grunge, alternative rock, power pop, emo-pop, and grunge song.

== Critical reception ==
"My Happy Ending" has generally received favorable reviews from critics. David Browne of Entertainment Weekly magazine commented "Lavigne herself sounds more burdened; ... the sk8erboi of the first album has turned out to be a selfish, nasty creep who ... treats her like crap". Allmusic highlighted the song as a "track pick" in a review of the album, Under My Skin. Blender also did the same. PopMatters thought "The second single, "My Happy Ending", suffers from a marked similarity to a few recent hits, notably Michelle Branch's "Everywhere" and Vanessa Carlton's "A Thousand Miles" (...) The ticklish good humor of "Sk8er Boi" has been subsumed by the sardonic regret of "My Happy Ending".

Juan Manuel compared the song to the music of Linkin Park, stating "It's a bit difficult to find references to Linkin Park in the interviews with Lavigne."

In an AOL Radio listener's poll, "My Happy Ending" was voted Lavigne's third best song. As of September 2015, "My Happy Ending" had sold 1.2 million digital copies in the US.

=== Accolades ===
Key
†	Indicates non-competitive categories

Award/Publisher	Year	Category	Result	Ref.
Allmusic	2012	Most Significant Post-grunge Songs of All Time †	Longlisted	
ASCAP Pop Music Awards	2006	Most Performed Song † (valid for Avril Lavigne's songwriting credit)	Won	
BMI Pop Music Awards	2006	Award-Winning Songs † (valid for Butch Walker's songwriting credit)	Won	
Capricho Awards	2004	International Song	Won	
MTV Video Music Awards Japan	2005	Best Female Video	Nominated	
MuchMusic Video Awards	2005	People's Choice Favourite Canadian Artist	Nominated	
Radio Disney Music Awards	2004	Best Song to Air Guitar	Won	
Rolling Stone	2026	The 200 Greatest Rock Songs of the 21st Century So Far (No. 186) †	Longlisted	

== Chart performance ==
"My Happy Ending" peaked at number nine on the US Billboard Hot 100, spending a total of 25 weeks on the chart. It climbed to number one on the Mainstream Top 40 chart and spent 26 weeks on the listing, and it reached number three on the Adult Top 40, where it also charted for 26 weeks. On the Adult Contemporary chart, it peaked at number 37. It was certified gold by the RIAA for selling 500,000 digital copies. As of September 2015, "My Happy Ending" has sold 1.2 million digital copies in the US.

== Music video ==
Lavigne watches scenes with her ex-boyfriend in the cinema.

The music video for "My Happy Ending" was written and directed by MTV and Grammy winner Meiert Avis. It was shot on location in Williamsburg, Brooklyn and Harlem, New York City. The video begins with Lavigne running down Broadway and entering a cinema (the Commodore Cinemas), where she finds the film playing is a montage of her memories concerning a specific relationship she had. At first, the memories (shown in full color) are happy, depicting Lavigne at the park with her boyfriend, as he hands her a flower and they laugh together. They are also shown goofing off inside a laundromat. However, as Lavigne sings "so much for my happy ending," the memories start losing color. Lavigne and her boyfriend lie in bed together, as she looks at him and he (obviously reeling from a disagreement) stares blankly away.

The relationship culminates during the song's bridge inside a grocery store, where her boyfriend antagonizes her, insisting that he talk to her. He grabs her and tries to pull her into his embrace. Fed up, she turns and pushes him away. She proceeds to run out of the grocery store and down the street (from the beginning of the video), and to a guitar shop where she grabs a guitar and walks to the roof of the building, where she is seen performing with her band. There, she walks past her unapologetic boyfriend without looking at him. Three other girls witness an altercation between Lavigne and her boyfriend in the restaurant and leave with Lavigne as they befriend each other. The theater film tears and the memories end, leaving the final seconds of the video as a close-up on Lavigne in the theater as she tries to decide if the break-up is happy after all.

Lavigne said of the video: "It's about a relationship that doesn't work out, and having to say goodbye to all of the memories and... all that stuff." When asked if the video for "My Happy Ending" actually contains a happy ending, Lavigne said: "I don't know if the video has a happy ending. It kind of depends on how you look at it? In one way, it is because me and 'the guy' in the video aren't together anymore, and I think that's a better thing."

== Live performances ==
"My Happy Ending" was first performed as part of Lavigne's Live by Surprise Tour, a group of 21 impromptu concerts in shopping malls that ran between March 5, 2004, and April 15, 2004. The song was also performed on Saturday Night Live on May 8, 2004. "My Happy Ending" was also performed during the Bonez Tour, the concert tour in support of Under My Skin. "My Happy Ending" was subsequently included in the setlists of Lavigne's later concert tours, including The Best Damn Tour (2008), the Black Star Tour (2011–2012), The Avril Lavigne Tour (2013–2014), the Head Above Water Tour (2019), the Love Sux Tour (2022–2023), and the Greatest Hits Tour (2024).

On August 26, 2005, Lavigne performed the song in Bryant Park as part of Good Morning America's televised "Summer Concert" series. Lavigne performed the song during the closing ceremonies of the 2010 Winter Olympics, alongside "Girlfriend".

== Track listings and formats ==
- Australian, German, and Taiwanese CD single
1. "My Happy Ending" (album version) – 4:02
2. "My Happy Ending" (live acoustic version) – 3:55
3. "Take Me Away" (live acoustic version) – 2:52
4. "Take It" – 2:51
5. "My Happy Ending" (video) – 4:02
- United States 7-inch vinyl
1. "My Happy Ending" – 4:02
2. "Don't Tell Me" – 3:21
- Japanese CD single
1. "My Happy Ending" (radio edit) – 4:02
2. "My Happy Ending" (album version) – 4:02
3. "Don't Tell Me" (live acoustic version) – 3:26
- European maxi-CD single
1. "My Happy Ending" (album version) – 4:02
2. "My Happy Ending" (live acoustic version) – 3:55
3. "Take Me Away" (live acoustic version) – 2:52
4. "My Happy Ending" (video) – 4:02
- European and United Kingdom CD single
1. "My Happy Ending" (album version) – 4:02
2. "Take It" – 2:51

== Personnel ==
Personnel are adapted from the Under My Skin album liner notes.

- Avril Lavigne – vocals, writer
- Butch Walker – writer, producer, electric guitar, bass, acoustic guitar, piano, programming
- Kenny Aronoff – drums, percussion
- Patrick Warren – keyboards, strings, Chamberlin
- Dan Chase – drum programming

== Charts ==
=== Weekly charts ===
Chart (2004)	Peak position
Australia (ARIA)	6
Austria (Ö3 Austria Top 40)	8
Belgium (Ultratop 50 Flanders)	30
Belgium (Ultratop 50 Wallonia)	30
Canada CHR/Pop Top 30 (Radio & Records)	2
Canada Hot AC Top 30 (Radio & Records)	2
CIS Airplay (TopHit)	68
Czech Republic (IFPI)	5
Europe (Eurochart Hot 100)	12
France (SNEP)	39
Germany (GfK)	17
Greece (IFPI)	12
Hungary (Rádiós Top 40)	16
Ireland (IRMA)	7
Italy (FIMI)	7
Japan (Oricon)	76
Netherlands (Dutch Top 40)	13
Netherlands (Single Top 100)	12
Norway (VG-lista)	6
Romania (Romanian Top 100)	30
Russia Airplay (TopHit)	56
Scottish Singles Sales (Official Charts)	4
Spain (Promusicae)	6
Sweden (Sverigetopplistan)	11
Switzerland (Schweizer Hitparade)	23
UK Singles (Official Charts)	5
Ukraine Airplay (TopHit)	104
US Billboard Hot 100	9
US Adult Contemporary (Billboard)	37
US Adult Pop Airplay (Billboard)	3
US Pop Airplay (Billboard)	1

Chart (2006)	Peak position
Czech Republic Airplay (ČNS IFPI)	76

=== Year-end charts ===
Chart (2004)	Position
Australia (ARIA)	62
Austria (Ö3 Austria Top 40)	45
Germany (Media Control GfK)	96
Sweden (Hitlistan)	66
UK Singles (OCC)	106
US Billboard Hot 100	54
US Adult Top 40 (Billboard)	26
US Mainstream Top 40 (Billboard)	15

== Certifications and sales ==
Region	Certification	Certified units/sales
Australia (ARIA)	Gold	35,000^{^}
Brazil (Pro-Música Brasil)	Platinum	60,000^{*}
Canada (Music Canada)	Platinum	80,000^{‡}
New Zealand (RMNZ)	Gold	15,000^{‡}
United Kingdom (BPI)	Gold	400,000^{‡}
United States (RIAA)	2× Platinum	2,000,000^{‡}
^{*} Sales figures based on certification alone.^{^} Shipments figures based on certification alone.^{‡} Sales+streaming figures based on certification alone.

== Release history ==
Release dates and formats for "My Happy Ending"
Region	Date	Format	Label(s)	Ref.
United States	June 14, 2004	Contemporary hit radio	Arista; RCA	
Germany	June 24, 2004	CD	Arista	
France	June 29, 2004	CD	Arista	
Japan	July 7, 2004	CD	BMG Japan	
Australia	July 19, 2004	CD	Arista	
United Kingdom	August 2, 2004	CD	Arista	

== Usage in media ==
"My Happy Ending" was used for the movie Bring It On: All or Nothing. The song was also used in the trailer for A Lot Like Love with Ashton Kutcher and Amanda Peet.

The song was used in a season four episode of Smallville, "Facade" (October 6, 2004) and in a season five episode of Gilmore Girls, with Dean's little sister listening to it. The song was used several episodes of MTV programs Date My Mom and Next.

The song has also appeared in video games, and has been featured in three major karaoke series: Lips, SingStar, and Karaoke Revolution.
