= Don't Tell Me (Avril Lavigne song) =

2004 single by Avril Lavigne

Single by Avril Lavigne

from the album Under My Skin
- B-side: "Take Me Away"
- Released: March 15, 2004
- Studio: Ruby Red Productions (Atlanta, Georgia); Skyline (New York City); Ocean Way Recording (Los Angeles)
- Genre: Post-grunge; alternative rock; folk rock; hard rock
- Length: 3:26 (single version); 3:22 (album version)
- Label: Arista; RCA
- Songwriters: Avril Lavigne; Evan Taubenfeld
- Producer: Butch Walker

Avril Lavigne singles chronology
"Mobile" (2003)	"Don't Tell Me" (2004)	"My Happy Ending" (2004)

Music video
- "Don't Tell Me" on YouTube

"Don't Tell Me" is a song by Canadian singer-songwriter Avril Lavigne from her second studio album, Under My Skin (2004). "Don't Tell Me" was written by Lavigne and Evan Taubenfeld, while it was produced by Butch Walker. The song has been noted as having a "grungy sound". "Don't Tell Me" was released on March 15, 2004, by Arista Records as the lead single from Under My Skin and peaked at number 22 on the US Billboard Hot 100 that same year. In an AOL Radio listener's poll, "Don't Tell Me" was voted Lavigne's ninth-best song.

== Background and composition ==
"Don't Tell Me" has been noted as having a "post-grunge and alternative rock sound" with grunge influences, which builds from a folk-rock verse to a hard rock chorus like a Morissette song When asked what "Don't Tell Me" was about, Lavigne said:

It's about being strong. There are a lot of guys out there who just want to take you out to dinner and then, like basically go home and 'unhh' you. That's what a lot of guys are like and I just think girls need to be strong and not let any guy pressure them into doing anything.

— Avril Lavigne, MTV.com

She also said in a 2007 interview:

When I was writing "Don't Tell Me", I was just, kind of, thinking about what it was like being a girl, and I was seventeen when I wrote that song, so that was all, like, fresh on my mind. I was just coming out of high school, and there's a lot of pressure for girls these days, and I'm happy to have that song, to be able to sing it up on stage every night, and to introduce it with, you know, by telling the audience that this song is all about being strong, and this goes out to all the girls, and it feels good to be able to do that.

— MTV.com

Some critics speculate that this song might be referring to Fred Durst, the lead singer of Limp Bizkit, whom she criticized in a 2004 interview with "Rolling Stone". "He took a private jet out to one of my shows, expecting me to bang him," Lavigne stated.

== Critical reception ==
Reviewing the album Under My Skin, David Browne of Entertainment Weekly described "Don't Tell Me" as such: "Lavigne herself sounds more burdened; ... the sk8erboi of the first album has turned out to be a selfish, nasty creep who leaves when she won't go to bed with him". Blender Music wrote that unlike "Sk8er Boi", the up-with-abstinence single "Don’t Tell Me" finds her kicking him out of bed. The Guardian was mixed: "Current single "Don't Tell Me" at least has some relevant advice to impart to her pubescent female fans: it depicts a confused and angry Lavigne fending off an over-eager boyfriend."

PopMatters was favorable: "The first single, "Don't Tell Me", is probably the best song on the album, with the kind of wonderfully effusive movement that makes the best pop so damn irresistible. It starts slow and quiet, building to the first chorus, ebbs back, builds to another chorus, drops down into a bridge before coming back with a skull-crunching third chorus that leaves the riff firmly implanted in your skull. One or two reprises and we're out like a light, end of song. At that point you're either convinced or not." Rolling Stone was positive: "The lead single, "Don't Tell Me," might be her most Avril-ish song yet, a petulant kiss-off to a horny boy. As the guitars get revved up behind her, she asks, "Did I not tell you that I'm not like that girl/The one who gives it all away, yeah/Did you think that I was going to give it up to you?" The syntax may be tortured, but the singer sounds just fine: a righteous prude, confidently fending off the creeps." Yahoo Music! liked the song: "we now have a stronger, more confident Avril - forthright in her determination not to lose her cherry on 'Don't Tell Me'".

=== Accolades ===
Award/Publisher	Year	Category	Result	Ref.
MTV Video Music Awards	2004	Best Pop Video	Nominated	
MTV Video Music Brazil	2004	Best International Video	Nominated	
MuchMusic Video Awards	2004	Best International Video By A Canadian	Won	
MuchMusic Video Awards	2004	People's Choice Favourite Canadian Artist	Won	
Radio Disney Music Awards	2004	Best Song	Nominated	
RTHK International Pop Poll Award	2005	Super Gold Song	Won	
RTHK International Pop Poll Award	2005	Top Ten International Gold Songs	Won	

== Commercial performance ==
"Don't Tell Me" reached number 22 on the US Billboard Hot 100, and it stayed on the chart for 20 weeks. On the US Adult Top 40 chart, it peaked at number 10 and remained on the chart for 26 weeks, while on Mainstream Top 40 chart, it reached number nine. The song was certified gold in the United States by the Recording Industry Association of America (RIAA) for selling 500,000 digital copies of the single.

== Music video ==
Lavigne breaks a mirror with her hands to vent her anger.

The accompanying music video for "Don't Tell Me" was directed by Liz Friedlander and filmed in Los Angeles in March 2004.

=== Synopsis ===
The video tells the story of the song. It opens with Lavigne's boyfriend leaving her apartment. After taking her anger out on her bedroom and mirror, she follows him around the city. During the bridge of the song, her boyfriend sees her in many places at once, so he is feeling guilty and her feelings are weighing heavily on his mind. At the end of the video, she decides that he is better off without her and lets him walk away, and in the final shot she begins to float above the surface.

=== Reception ===
The video was nominated for Best Pop Video at the 2004 MTV Video Music Awards, but lost to No Doubt's video for "It's My Life".

== Track listings and formats ==
- Australian CD single
1. "Don't Tell Me" (single version) – 3:26
2. "Don't Tell Me" (live acoustic) – 3:38
3. "Take Me Away" – 2:55
- European CD/digital single
1. "Don't Tell Me" (single version) – 3:26
2. "Don't Tell Me" (live acoustic) – 3:38
- Japanese CD single
1. "Don't Tell Me" (single version) – 3:26
2. "Take Me Away" – 2:55

== Personnel ==
Personnel are adapted from the Under My Skin liner notes.

- Avril Lavigne – vocals, writer
- Butch Walker – producer, electric guitar, bass, keyboards, percussion, programming, and background vocals
- Evan Taubenfeld – writer, electric guitar, acoustic guitar, background vocals
- Kenny Cresswell – drums
- Russ-T Cobb – recording
- Dan Chase – Pro-Tools engineering
- Sean Loughlin – engineering assistance
- Mauricio Cersosimo – engineering assistance
- Tom Sweeney – engineering assistance
- Tom Lord-Alge – mixing
- Femio Hernandez – mixing assistance
- Christie Priode – production coordination

== Charts ==
=== Weekly charts ===
Chart (2004)	Peak position
Australia (ARIA)	10
Austria (Ö3 Austria Top 40)	12
Belgium (Ultratop 50 Flanders)	22
Belgium (Ultratop 50 Wallonia)	28
Bolivia (Notimex)	2
Canada (Nielsen SoundScan)	5
Canada CHR/Pop Top 30 (Radio & Records)	4
Canada Hot AC Top 30 (Radio & Records)	3
CIS Airplay (TopHit)	56
Croatia (HRT)	2
Denmark (Tracklisten)	14
Europe (Eurochart Hot 100)	8
France (SNEP)	53
Germany (GfK)	10
Greece (IFPI)	10
Hungary (Rádiós Top 40)	30
Ireland (IRMA)	9
Italy (FIMI)	4
Japan (Oricon)	35
Netherlands (Dutch Top 40)	8
Netherlands (Single Top 100)	20
New Zealand (Recorded Music NZ)	15
Norway (VG-lista)	12
Paraguay (Notimex)	2
Peru (Notimex)	5
Romania (Romanian Top 100)	44
Russia Airplay (TopHit)	50
Scottish Singles Sales (Official Charts)	3
Spain (Promusicae)	8
Sweden (Sverigetopplistan)	30
Switzerland (Schweizer Hitparade)	9
UK Singles (Official Charts)	5
Ukraine Airplay (TopHit)	101
Uruguay (Notimex)	5
US Billboard Hot 100	22
US Adult Pop Airplay (Billboard)	10
US Pop Airplay (Billboard)	9

=== Year-end charts ===
Chart (2004)	Position
Australia (ARIA)	98
Brazil (Crowley)	51
Italy (FIMI)	31
Netherlands (Dutch Top 40)	95
Switzerland (Schweizer Hitparade)	94
UK Singles (OCC)	115
US Billboard Hot 100	92
US Adult Top 40 (Billboard)	27
US Mainstream Top 40 (Billboard)	33

== Certifications ==
Region	Certification	Certified units/sales
Australia (ARIA)	Gold	35,000^{^}
United States (RIAA)	Gold	500,000^{*}
^{*} Sales figures based on certification alone.^{^} Shipments figures based on certification alone.

== Release history ==
Release dates and formats for "Don't Tell Me"
Region	Date	Format(s)	Label(s)	Ref.
United States	March 15, 2004	Adult contemporary radio; contemporary hit radio; hot adult contemporary radio	Arista	
Australia	April 19, 2004	CD	Arista; BMG	
Denmark	April 26, 2004	CD	Arista; BMG	
Germany	April 26, 2004	CD	Arista; BMG	
Japan	April 28, 2004	CD	Arista; BMG	
United Kingdom	May 10, 2004	CD	Arista; BMG	
