= Tweak (band) =

South African alternative rock band

- Origin: Johannesburg, Gauteng, South Africa, London, England
- Genres: Pop punk, alternative rock, punk rock
- Years active: 1998–2006, 2015 (reunion), 2017 (reunion), 2019 (reunion)
- Spinoffs: Crashcarburn
- Past members: Garth Barnes; Brendan "Bugsy" Barnes; Douglas Rodger; Paul Mathis; Mike Stott; Dylan Belton; Chris Brink
- Website: TweakBand

Tweak was an alternative rock band from South Africa. Remaining members of the band formed Crashcarburn after the rest of the band parted ways in 2006 to pursue personal projects. They have returned three times for a reunion tour, and the first two of these times they accompanied their comeback with a new song.

== History ==
=== Early days, Take Note ===
Tweak was formed in late 1998 by Garth Barnes, Mike Stott, and Chris Brink. With the money won from a Battle of the Bands contest in August 2000 they recorded their debut EP, Take Note, at a tiny single garage at B Sharp Studios in Boksburg with the help of a local producer, John Paul de Stefani. The EP was tracked, mixed and mastered in just under 14 hours. This was the first time samples were experimented with, such as the sonar sample in the intro to "One Night". "The Long Road" was the defining song on the EP, and was written after a friend of Garth had tried to commit suicide and dealt with what might have led someone to resort to making such a decision and the 'Long Road' to recovery that follows such an attempt.

=== Success, possums and a permanent drummer ===
The band struggled for about a year without a permanent drummer. It took almost another year of on-off recording again at B Sharp Studios to complete their full first full-length album, The Romantic Lure of Possum Worship. The band wanted to get the old songs out of the way so they could start performing the new ones and Possum Worship was to be sort of a 'throw-away' release so that they could get to the 'cool songs'. "Buy the World" was not initially going to be recorded, but the producer insisted. Little did they know, with the backing of their new management Authentic Ideas, the record would go on to sell 20,000 copies, going Gold in South Africa. The hidden-track phone calls were recorded at Chris' house on a dictaphone late one Saturday Night. "Birthday Card" was the song that got their name out to a mainstream audience. It was written after Garth had separated with his then-girlfriend. "I remember thinking, 'Just you wait and see, I'm gonna write the best FUCKING song ever and when we're famous, you're gonna BEG me to take you back.'" After Possum Worship was released, Garth Barnes' younger brother, Brendan (more commonly known by his nickname of Bugsy), joined the band as a permanent drummer.

=== Dirty Sanchez and the Misfit Kidz, international touring ===
Dirty Sanchez and the Misfit Kidz was recorded in January 2003 with a much bigger budget at the world-class SABC Studios. This was Bugsy's first time in the studio. With only Bugsy left at school, they started doing the band full-time and were performing almost every night. By the end of 2004, they had performed at every festival in the country, including an opening slot for Wheatus. With airplay on MTV Europe as well as on MTV Australia, Tweak managed to independently finance and organise tours to Australia, Germany, the Netherlands, Switzerland and the United Kingdom.

=== Lost Boys Club, Greatest Hits ===
The Lost Boys Club, which was recorded in April 2004 and released in May, saw the band take a different musical direction. The release was themed around the idea of hanging onto one's youth as long as one can (much like Peter Pan and his Lost Boys Club), but still growing up despite what one might try and do to avoid it. They also opened for Avril Lavigne on her Bonez Tour. Tweak: A Greatest Hits Collection was released in 2005, a CD+DVD showcasing the band biggest hits, including 2 new songs, "Fallen" and "Fueling the Flame", which were later released on Fallen, a 6-track EP. One other song was recorded, "Under a Falling Sky", which was later released on This City Needs a Hero under their new name, Crashcarburn.

=== Arrival in UK, guitarist departure, name change ===
In January 2005, sheer determination and self-belief led Tweak to sell everything they owned and head for the United Kingdom. Mike Stott left the band and stayed behind in South Africa and later started his own band, Unwritten Friday. It was then that they picked up old friend and guitarist, Dylan Belton to fill in for Mike. Fallen was released shortly after they arrived in London. In late 2005, Tweak returned to South Africa to record their last songs under the name Tweak. These songs went on to appear on Crashcarburn EP, as the band changed their name after the disc was recorded. In 2006, the band were forced to change their name for legal reasons, and Crashcarburn was born.

Official statement:

2006/04/23 – Farewell Tweak. RIP Almost 8 years after our first ever gig at a school talent show, we are being forced to change our name for legal reasons. Owing to our increased activity in America, The United Kingdom and other international territories (and a 'First Use' law that dates back to the stone age) we are now only allowed to use the name Tweak in our home territory.

However, all is not lost! We will be releasing an EP under our brand-new name very soon and feel that we are musically, stronger than ever! We will also be taking this opportunity to update our Biography, Web site and Myspace pages to ensure that they more accurately depict who we are as a band today.

We'd like to express our sincerest thanks to everyone who has made these past years as Tweak so fantastically memorable. To everyone who ever attended a show, bought a CD or sent us an email, we appreciate it more than you could ever know and we ask for your continued support as we bid farewell to Tweak and say hello to: CRASHCARBURN

=== Formation ===
Crashcarburn was formed from the demise of Tweak after they had relocated to London. They had already released one EP with their new sound and new attitude, Fallen. In 2006 the Band were forced to change their name for legal reasons, and they settled on Crashcarburn. Front man Garth explains the name change:

The more time we spent on the band, the more we realise that we have a rare opportunity to have a positive influence on people. We're not trying to be some kind of 'Saviour for the youth' and we definitely don't wonna preach, Fuck knows we're far from perfect. We just don't want anyone to settle for 'average'. We want them to realise that ordinary people are capable of Great things! You don't have to do something earthshaking like, find a cure for cancer, to be great. You just need to exceed what the world expects of you.

=== Crashcarburn EP ===
In 2005 Crashcarburn recorded their debut self titled EP at SABC Radio Park Studios which was released in the UK in early 2006. The track Broken Skyline received regular playback on Kerrang Radio and was featured on the Kerrang! Unsigned compilation. In late 2006 the band recorded a further 4 tracks with the producer / engineer Matt Hyde whose previous works include bands such as Bullet for my Valentine, Funeral for a Friend, Machinehead and Slipknot. The tracks would later appear on the band's debut full-length album, This City Needs a Hero.

=== Return to South Africa, This City Needs a Hero ===
In 2007 the band left the UK and returned to South Africa. Chris Brink and Dylan Belton were replaced by Etienne Janse van Rensburg and Ian Broekhuizen respectively. Shortly after returning home, the band released their debut full-length album, This City Needs a Hero. They immediately started filming the video for Serenade, the first single off the new album, with director, Thomas Ferreira. With their first single Serenade topping rock charts across the country, the band quickly found themselves opening for acts such as OK GO in February 2008 and Korn, Muse, Good Charlotte, Chris Cornell, Thirty Seconds to Mars and Kaiser Chiefs in March 2008.

=== Reunion tours ===
Near the end of 2015, Tweak returned for a number of shows - starting off at the annual OppiKoppi festival. Along with their comeback tour, they released a new song, 'The A Team', which was well received from long time fans. On 11 July 2017, Tweak announced their second reunion tour, which ran from 28 October until 11 November of the same year. They also released their new one-off single, "Bruce Lee", on 12 September 2017. Tweak performed at the South African Pirate Fest in 2019, opening for Atreyu and Alestorm.

== Band members ==
Garth Barnes – vocals and rhythm guitar
Ricki Allemann – lead guitar
Chris Brink – bass
Brendan "Bugsy" Barnes – drums

== Discography ==
=== As Tweak ===
Date	Title
1999	Untitled EP
1999	Take Note
2001	The Romantic Lure of Possum Worship
2003	Dirty Sanchez and the Misfit Kids
2004	The Lost Boys Club
2005	Tweak: A Greatest Hits Collection
2005	Fallen

=== As Crashcarburn ===
Date	Title
2005	Crashcarburn EP
2007	This City Needs a Hero
2010	Long Live Tonight
2012	Gravity
2018	Headlights
