= List of Avril Lavigne concert tours =

Canadian recording artist Avril Lavigne has completed seven concert tours beginning with the Try to Shut Me Up Tour in 2002–03. This was followed by the 13-month Bonez Tour in 2004–05 and The Best Damn World Tour in 2008. Her Love Sux Tour completed in May 2023. The following is a chronological list of her concert tours.

== Bonez Tour ==
Bonez Tour
- World tour by Avril Lavigne
- Promotional poster for tour
- Location: Africa; Asia; Europe; North America; Oceania; South America
- Associated album: Under My Skin
- Start date: September 26, 2004
- End date: September 25, 2005
- Legs: 8
- No. of shows: 145

Avril Lavigne concert chronology
- Live by Surprise Tour (2004); Bonez Tour (2004–2005); The Best Damn Thing Promotional Tour (2007)

The Bonez Tour was the second concert tour by Canadian recording artist, Avril Lavigne. In support of her second studio album Under My Skin (2004), the tour began in the fall of 2004. Playing over one hundred shows in Europe, North America, South America, Australia, Asia and Africa. The performances in 2004 ranked 97th on Pollstar's "Top Tours of 2004", earning over $5 million. The tour was recorded at the Nippon Budokan in Tokyo, Japan for the DVD set, Live at Budokan: Bonez Tour. The DVD featured the full concert with behind the scenes footage. The video was certified Gold in Japan.

=== Setlists ===
Europe / North America (2004)
1. "He Wasn't"
2. "My Happy Ending"
3. "Freak Out"
4. "Sk8er Boi"
5. "Losing Grip"
6. "Who Knows"
7. "Together"
8. "I'm with You"
9. "Forgotten"
10. "Mobile"
11. "Unwanted"
12. "Naked"
13. "Fall to Pieces"
14. "Nobody's Home"
15. "Don't Tell Me"

Encore

16. "Song 2"
17. "Complicated"
18. "Slipped Away"
Asia (2005)
1. "He Wasn't"
2. "My Happy Ending"
3. "Take Me Away"
4. "Freak Out"
5. "Sk8er Boi"
6. "Unwanted"
7. "Anything but Ordinary"
8. "Who Knows"
9. "I'm with You"
10. "Naked"
11. "Losing Grip"
12. "Together"
13. "Forgotten"
14. "Tomorrow"
15. "Fall to Pieces"
16. "Nobody's Home"
17. "Don't Tell Me"

Encore

18. "Complicated"
19. "Slipped Away"
Australia / Africa (2005)
1. "Losing Grip"
2. "Unwanted"
3. "My Happy Ending"
4. "Mobile"
5. "I Always Get What I Want"
6. "Things I'll Never Say"
7. "I'm with You"
8. "Who Knows"
9. "Don't Tell Me"
10. "Take Me Away"
11. "He Wasn't"
12. "American Idiot"
13. "Together"
14. "Forgotten"
15. "Tomorrow"
16. "Nobody's Home"
17. "Sk8er Boi"

Encore

18. "Song 2"
19. "Complicated"

Europe / North America / South America (2005)
1. "Sk8er Boi"
2. "Unwanted"
3. "My Happy Ending"
4. "I Always Get What I Want"
5. "Mobile"
6. "I'm with You"
7. "Fall to Pieces"
8. "Don't Tell Me"
9. "Together"
10. "Forgotten"
11. "Tomorrow"
12. "Nobody's Home"
13. "Who Knows"
14. "Losing Grip"
15. "Take Me Away"
16. "He Wasn't"

Encore

17. "All the Small Things"
18. "Song 2"
19. "Complicated"

The setlist from the May 8, 2005 / Johannesburg (Coca-Cola Dome) show; not the setlist from very show on the tour leg. Source:

Notes
- During North American shows in 2004, "I Always Get What I Want" was performed.
- During shows in Santiago and Buenos Aires, "American Idiot" replaced "All the Small Things".

=== Tour dates ===
List of 2004 concerts, showing date, city, country, venue, tickets sold, number of available tickets and amount of gross revenue
Date (2004)	City	Country	Venue	Opening act(s)	Attendance	Revenue
September 26	Munich	Germany	Olympiahalle	Bowling for Soup	—N/a	—N/a
September 27	Düsseldorf	Germany	Philipshalle	Bowling for Soup	—N/a	—N/a
September 28	Paris	France	Zénith de Paris	—N/a	—N/a	—N/a
September 30	Amsterdam	Netherlands	Heineken Music Hall	Bowling for Soup	—N/a	—N/a
October 1	Brussels	Belgium	Forest National	—N/a	—N/a	—N/a
October 3	Manchester	England	Manchester Evening News Arena	Simple Plan	—N/a	—N/a
October 4	Birmingham	England	National Indoor Arena	Simple Plan	—N/a	—N/a
October 6	Belfast	Northern Ireland	Odyssey Arena	Simple Plan	—N/a	—N/a
October 7	Glasgow	Scotland	SECC Concert Hall 4	Simple Plan	—N/a	—N/a
October 9	Cardiff	Wales	Cardiff International Arena	Simple Plan	—N/a	—N/a
October 10	London	England	Wembley Arena	Simple Plan	—N/a	—N/a
October 11	London	England	Wembley Arena	Simple Plan	—N/a	—N/a
October 12	Sheffield	England	Hallam FM Arena	Simple Plan	—N/a	—N/a
October 25	Dallas	United States	American Airlines Center	Butch Walker	—N/a	—N/a
October 26	San Antonio	United States	SBC Center	—N/a	—N/a	—N/a
October 27	New Orleans	United States	UNO Lakefront Arena	—N/a	—N/a	—N/a
October 28	Atlanta	United States	Philips Arena	—N/a	—N/a	—N/a
October 30	Hampton	United States	Hampton Coliseum	—N/a	—N/a	—N/a
October 31	Philadelphia	United States	Wachovia Spectrum	Butch Walker	—N/a	—N/a
November 1	Boston	United States	FleetCenter	Butch Walker	10,340 / 12,500 (83%)	$350,947
November 3	Auburn Hills	United States	The Palace of Auburn Hills	—N/a	7,582 / 10,435 (73%)	$261,198
November 4	Toronto	Canada	Air Canada Centre	—N/a	14,632 / 14,632 (100%)	$475,470
November 5	Cleveland	United States	CSU Convocation Center	—N/a	—N/a	—N/a
November 6	Cincinnati	United States	U.S. Bank Arena	—N/a	—N/a	—N/a
November 8	East Rutherford	United States	Continental Airlines Arena	Butch Walker	9,140 / 11,527	$325,750
November 9	Fairfax	United States	Patriot Center	—N/a	—N/a	—N/a
November 11	Chicago	United States	United Center	Butch Walker	9,895 / 12,500	$361,275
November 12	Milwaukee	United States	Bradley Center	—N/a	—N/a	—N/a
November 14	Denver	United States	Pepsi Center	—N/a	—N/a	—N/a
November 15	Salt Lake City	United States	Delta Center	—N/a	—N/a	—N/a
November 16	Las Vegas	United States	Thomas & Mack Center	—N/a	—N/a	—N/a
November 17	Glendale	United States	Glendale Arena	—N/a	7,866 / 7,866 (100%)	$189,985
November 19	San Jose	United States	HP Pavilion	—N/a	—N/a	—N/a
November 20	San Diego	United States	Cox Arena	—N/a	—N/a	—N/a
November 21	Fresno	United States	Save Mart Center	Butch Walker	5,363 / 5,992	$313,600
November 23	Portland	United States	Rose Garden	Butch Walker	—N/a	—N/a
November 24	Vancouver	Canada	Pacific Coliseum	Butch Walker	11,730 / 11,730 (100%)	$375,648
November 25	Kelowna	Canada	Prospera Place	Butch Walker	—N/a	—N/a
December 3 (Note: The December 3, 2004 concert in Anaheim was part of "KIIS-FM Jingle Ball")	Anaheim	United States	Arrowhead Pond of Anaheim	—N/a	—N/a	—N/a
December 4 (Note: The December 4, 2004 concert in Sacramento was part of the "107.9 The End's Jungle Ball")	Sacramento	United States	ARCO Arena	—N/a	13,171 / 14,105 (93%)	$416,025
December 5 (Note: The December 5, 2004 concert in Tacoma was part of the "Kiss 106.1 Jingle Bell Bash")	Tacoma	United States	Tacoma Dome	—N/a	11,246 / 16,978 (66%)	$506,090
December 8 (Note: The December 8, 2004 concert in Houston was part of the "KDWB 101.3's Jingle Ball")	Houston	United States	Reliant Arena	—N/a	—N/a	—N/a
December 11 (Note: The December 11, 2004 concert in Minneapolis was part of the "KRBE 104.1's Jingle Jam")	Minneapolis	United States	Target Center	—N/a	13,158 / 13,889	$254,070

List of 2005 concerts, showing date, city, country, venue, tickets sold, number of available tickets and amount of gross revenue
Date (2005)	City	Country	Venue	Opening act(s)	Attendance	Revenue
March 1	Osaka	Japan	Osaka-Jo Hall	—N/a	—N/a	—N/a
March 2	Osaka	Japan	Osaka-Jo Hall	—N/a	—N/a	—N/a
March 4	Nagoya	Japan	Nagoya Rainbow Hall	—N/a	—N/a	—N/a
March 6	Yokohama	Japan	Yokohama Arena	—N/a	—N/a	—N/a
March 7	Hiroshima	Japan	Hiroshima Green Arena	—N/a	—N/a	—N/a
March 8	Fukuoka	Japan	Marine Messe Fukuoka	—N/a	—N/a	—N/a
March 10	Tokyo	Japan	Nippon Budokan	—N/a	—N/a	—N/a
March 11	Hamamatsu	Japan	Hamamatsu Arena	—N/a	—N/a	—N/a
March 12	Kobe	Japan	World Memorial Hall	—N/a	—N/a	—N/a
March 14	Tokyo	Japan	Nippon Budokan	—N/a	—N/a	—N/a
March 15	Tokyo	Japan	Nippon Budokan	—N/a	—N/a	—N/a
March 16	Nagoya	Japan	Aichi Prefectural Gymnasium	—N/a	—N/a	—N/a
March 18	Sapporo	Japan	Hokkaido Prefectural Sports Center	—N/a	—N/a	—N/a
March 20	Tokyo	Japan	Zepp Tokyo	—N/a	—N/a	—N/a
March 23	Seoul	South Korea	Olympic Fencing Gymnasium	—N/a	—N/a	—N/a
March 25	Wan Chai	Hong Kong	HKCEC Hall 3	—N/a	—N/a	—N/a
March 27	Bangkok	Thailand	Impact Arena	Simple Plan	—N/a	—N/a
March 29	Taipei	Taiwan	Taipei Municipal Stadium	—N/a	—N/a	—N/a
March 31	Taguig	Philippines	Fort Bonifacio	Simple Plan	—N/a	—N/a
April 2	Kallang	Singapore	Singapore Indoor Stadium	—N/a	—N/a	—N/a
April 4	Jakarta	Indonesia	Istora Senayan	—N/a	—N/a	—N/a
April 6	Perth	Australia	Challenge Stadium	—N/a	—N/a	—N/a
April 8	Adelaide	Australia	Adelaide Entertainment Centre	—N/a	—N/a	—N/a
April 9	Melbourne	Australia	Rod Laver Arena	—N/a	—N/a	—N/a
April 11	Brisbane	Australia	Brisbane Entertainment Centre	—N/a	—N/a	—N/a
April 12	Sydney	Australia	Sydney Entertainment Centre	—N/a	—N/a	—N/a
April 13	Newcastle	Australia	Newcastle Entertainment Centre	—N/a	—N/a	—N/a
May 8	Johannesburg	South Africa	Coca-Cola Dome	Tweak	—N/a	—N/a
May 10	Durban	South Africa	Westridge Park Tennis Stadium	Tweak	—N/a	—N/a
May 13	Cape Town	South Africa	Bellville Velodrome	Tweak	—N/a	—N/a
May 16	Dublin	Ireland	Point Theatre	—N/a	—N/a	—N/a
May 17	Glasgow	Scotland	Carling Academy Glasgow	—N/a	—N/a	—N/a
May 18	Glasgow	Scotland	Carling Academy Glasgow	—N/a	—N/a	—N/a
May 20	London	England	Hammersmith Apollo	—N/a	—N/a	—N/a
May 21	London	England	Hammersmith Apollo	—N/a	—N/a	—N/a
May 22	Birmingham	England	NEC Arena	—N/a	—N/a	—N/a
May 23	Brighton	England	Brighton Centre	—N/a	—N/a	—N/a
May 25	Lyon	France	Halle Tony Garnier	—N/a	—N/a	—N/a
May 26	Marseille	France	Le Dôme de Marseille	—N/a	—N/a	—N/a
May 27	Barcelona	Spain	Palau Sant Jordi	No Children	—N/a	—N/a
May 29 (Note: The May 29, 2005 concert in Milan was part of the "Cornetto Free Music Festival")	Milan	Italy	Piazza del Duomo	—N/a	—N/a	—N/a
May 31	Naples	Italy	Piazza del Plebiscito	—N/a	—N/a	—N/a
June 2	Vienna	Austria	Bank Austria Halle	—N/a	—N/a	—N/a
June 3	Prague	Czech Republic	T-Mobile Arena	—N/a	—N/a	—N/a
June 5	Budapest	Hungary	Budapest Sports Arena	—N/a	—N/a	—N/a
June 6	Katowice	Poland	Spodek	—N/a	—N/a	—N/a
June 7	Bratislava	Slovakia	Incheba	—N/a	—N/a	—N/a
June 9	Geneva	Switzerland	SEG Geneva Arena	—N/a	—N/a	—N/a
June 10	Basel	Switzerland	St. Jakobshalle	—N/a	—N/a	—N/a
June 11	Frankfurt	Germany	Jahrhunderthalle	—N/a	—N/a	—N/a
June 13	Bonn	Germany	Museumsplatz	—N/a	—N/a	—N/a
June 14	Berlin	Germany	Arena Berlin	—N/a	—N/a	—N/a
June 15	Böblingen	Germany	Sporthalle Böblingen	—N/a	—N/a	—N/a
June 16	Hamburg	Germany	Stadtpark Freilichtbühne	—N/a	—N/a	—N/a
June 18 (Note: The June 18, 2006 concert in Copenhagen was part of "Zulu Rocks")	Copenhagen	Denmark	Parken Stadium	—N/a	—N/a	—N/a
June 20	Helsinki	Finland	Helsinki Ice Hall	—N/a	—N/a	—N/a
June 22	Stockholm	Sweden	Stockholm Globe Arena	—N/a	—N/a	—N/a
June 26	Luxembourg City	Luxembourg	Den Atelier	—N/a	—N/a	—N/a
July 12	Hamilton	Canada	Copps Coliseum	Not by Choice	—N/a	—N/a
July 13	London	Canada	John Labatt Centre	Not by Choice	—N/a	—N/a
July 14	Ottawa	Canada	Corel Centre	Not by Choice	10,475 / 12,712 (82%)	$510,004
July 15	Toronto	Canada	Air Canada Centre	Not by Choice	14,028 / 14,632 (96%)	$543,287
July 17	Clarkston	United States	DTE Energy Music Theatre	Butch Walker	—N/a	—N/a
July 19	Nashville	United States	Starwood Amphitheatre	Butch Walker	—N/a	—N/a
July 21	Maryland Heights	United States	UMB Bank Pavilion	Butch Walker	—N/a	—N/a
July 22	Kansas City	United States	Starlight Theatre	Butch Walker	—N/a	—N/a
July 23	Moline	United States	MARK of the Quad Cities	Butch Walker	—N/a	—N/a
July 25	Winnipeg	Canada	MTS Centre	Butch Walker	11,080 / 11,780 (94%)	$428,828
July 26	Regina	Canada	Agridome	Butch Walker	—N/a	—N/a
July 27	Saskatoon	Canada	Credit Union Centre	Butch Walker	10,438 / 12,951 (85%)	$403,502
July 29	Edmonton	Canada	Rexall Place	Butch Walker	10,989 / 11,990 (92%)	$423,058
July 30	Calgary	Canada	Pengrowth Saddledome	Butch Walker	—N/a	—N/a
July 31	Kamloops	Canada	Sport Mart Place	Butch Walker	—N/a	—N/a
August 2	Kelowna	Canada	Prospera Place	Butch Walker	—N/a	—N/a
August 3	Prince George	Canada	CN Centre	Butch Walker	—N/a	—N/a
August 5	Victoria	Canada	Save-On-Foods Memorial Centre	Butch Walker	—N/a	—N/a
August 6	Victoria	Canada	Save-On-Foods Memorial Centre	Butch Walker	—N/a	—N/a
August 8	Auburn	United States	White River Amphitheatre	Gavin DeGraw; Butch Walker	—N/a	—N/a
August 10	Concord	United States	Chronicle Pavilion	Gavin DeGraw; Butch Walker	—N/a	—N/a
August 11	Los Angeles	United States	Greek Theatre	Gavin DeGraw; Butch Walker	—N/a	—N/a
August 12	Los Angeles	United States	Greek Theatre	Gavin DeGraw; Butch Walker	—N/a	—N/a
August 13	Las Vegas	United States	The Joint	Butch Walker	—N/a	—N/a
August 14	Albuquerque	United States	Tingley Coliseum	Butch Walker	—N/a	—N/a
August 16	The Woodlands	United States	Cynthia Woods Mitchell Pavilion	Gavin DeGraw; Butch Walker	—N/a	—N/a
August 17	Dallas	United States	Smirnoff Music Centre	Gavin DeGraw; Butch Walker	—N/a	—N/a
August 19	Atlanta	United States	HiFi Buys Amphitheatre	Gavin DeGraw; Butch Walker	—N/a	—N/a
August 20	Tampa	United States	Ford Amphitheatre	Gavin DeGraw; Butch Walker	—N/a	—N/a
August 21	West Palm Beach	United States	Sound Advice Amphitheatre	Gavin DeGraw; Butch Walker	—N/a	—N/a
August 23	Charlotte	United States	Verizon Wireless Amphitheatre	Gavin DeGraw; Butch Walker	—N/a	—N/a
August 24	Raleigh	United States	Alltel Pavilion	Gavin DeGraw; Butch Walker	—N/a	—N/a
August 25	Holmdel	United States	PNC Bank Arts Center	Gavin DeGraw; Butch Walker	—N/a	—N/a
August 27	Wantagh	United States	Tommy Hilfiger at Jones Beach Theater	Gavin DeGraw; Butch Walker	—N/a	—N/a
August 28	Saratoga Springs	United States	Saratoga Performing Arts Center	Gavin DeGraw; Butch Walker	—N/a	—N/a
August 29	Mansfield	United States	Tweeter Center for the Performing Arts	Gavin DeGraw; Butch Walker	—N/a	—N/a
August 31	Halifax	Canada	Halifax Metro Centre	Butch Walker	—N/a	—N/a
September 1	Moncton	Canada	Moncton Coliseum	Butch Walker	—N/a	—N/a
September 2	Quebec City	Canada	Colisée Pepsi	Butch Walker	—N/a	—N/a
September 3	Montreal	Canada	Bell Centre	Butch Walker	—N/a	—N/a
September 11	Monterrey	Mexico	Auditorio Coca-Cola	Tolidos	7,673 / 12,202 (63%)	$405,565
September 13	Mexico City	Mexico	Palacio de los Deportes	Tolidos	18,576 / 18,576 (100%)	$609,997
September 15	Santiago	Chile	Estadio San Carlos de Apoquindo	Gufi	—N/a	—N/a
September 17	Buenos Aires	Argentina	Estadio Obras Sanitarias	Daniela Herrero	—N/a	—N/a
September 18	Buenos Aires	Argentina	Estadio Obras Sanitarias	Daniela Herrero	—N/a	—N/a
September 22	Porto Alegre	Brazil	Gigantinho Gymnasium	Leela	—N/a	—N/a
September 23 (Note: The September 23, 2005 concert in Curitiba was part of the "Curitiba Rock Festival")	Curitiba	Brazil	Paulo Leminski Arena	Leela	—N/a	—N/a
September 24	Rio de Janeiro	Brazil	Praça da Apoteose	Leela	—N/a	—N/a
September 25	São Paulo	Brazil	Estádio do Pacaembu	Leela	34,437 / 45,000 (77%)	$835,887
Total					231,819 / 270,997 (86%)	$7,586,684

== Black Star Tour ==
Black Star Tour
- World tour by Avril Lavigne
- Location: Asia; Europe; North America; South America
- Associated album: Goodbye Lullaby
- Start date: April 30, 2011
- End date: February 18, 2012
- Legs: 3
- No. of shows: 61

Avril Lavigne concert chronology
- The Best Damn Tour (2008); The Black Star Tour (2011–2012); The Avril Lavigne Tour (2013–2014)

The Black Star Tour was the fourth concert tour by Canadian recording artist Avril Lavigne. Visiting Asia, North America, South America and Europe, the tour promoter the singer's fourth studio album, Goodbye Lullaby (2011). Before the tour started, Lavigne said that she wanted the show to be intimate and personal, with guitars, piano and voice. She also said that wanted to play in small venues, to have a bigger contact with her fans.

=== Commercial performance ===
The tour was successful on tickets sales. A week after the Asian dates had been released, it was announced that 13,000 tickets were sold for Osaka, Japan. It also went really well in South America, where more than 55,000 tickets were sold, with price averaging $75-$120. All the tickets that went on sale for the first show in São Paulo were completely sold out on the same day. The concert held in Rio de Janeiro and Caracas had the higher grossings for the South American leg. In China, extra concerts were added for the second Asian leg, in Beijing and Guangzhou where Lavigne played for 10,000 fans at Guangzhou Gymnasium. On August 24, 2011, Lavigne ranked #15 position at Billboard boxscore due both shows in São Paulo, which grossed $980,009 combined. The tour has grossed US$25 million, with 61 concerts.

=== Setlists ===
South America
1. "Black Star"
2. "What the Hell"
3. "Sk8er Boi"
4. "He Wasn't"
5. "I Always Get What I Want"
6. "Alice"
7. "Fix You"
8. "When You're Gone"
9. "Stop Standing There"
10. "Wish You Were Here"
11. "Nobody's Home"
12. "Girlfriend"
13. "My Happy Ending"
14. "Don't Tell Me"
15. "Smile"
16. "I'm with You”

Encore

17. "Hot"
18. "Push"
19. "Complicated"
Europe
1. "Black Star"
2. "What the Hell"
3. "I Can Do Better"
4. "Sk8er Boi"
5. "He Wasn't"
6. "I Always Get What I Want"
7. "Alice"
8. "When You're Gone"
9. "Stop Standing There"
10. "Wish You Were Here"
11. "Girlfriend"
12. "My Happy Ending"
13. "Don't Tell Me"
14. "Smile"
15. "I'm with You"
16. "I Love You"

Encore

17. "Hot"
18. "Complicated"
North America
1. "Black Star"
2. "What the Hell"
3. "Sk8er Boi"
4. "He Wasn't"
5. "Don't Tell Me"
6. "I Always Get What I Want"
7. "Alice"
8. "When You're Gone"
9. "Wish You Were Here"
10. "Girlfriend"
11. "Smile"
12. "My Happy Ending"
13. "I'm with You"

Encore

14. "Nobody's Home"
15. "Everybody Hurts"
16. "Complicated"
Notes
- "Keep Holding On" and "I Love You" were performed at select concerts in South America.
- "Everybody Hurts" was performed during the second concert in São Paulo.
- During the North American leg, "Best Years of Our Lives", "Tomorrow", and "I Love You" were performed on select dates during the encore.

=== Tour dates ===
List of concerts, showing date, city, country, venue, tickets sold, number of available tickets and amount of gross revenue
Date	City	Country	Venue	Opening act(s)	Attendance	Revenue
Asia
April 30, 2011 (Note: The April 30, 2011 concert in Beijing was part of the "China Valley International Music Festival")	Beijing	China	Yuyang International Ski Resort	—N/a	—N/a	—N/a
May 2, 2011	Shanghai	China	Shanghai Indoor Stadium	—N/a	—N/a	—N/a
May 5, 2011	Seoul	South Korea	Melon-AX Hall	—N/a	—N/a	—N/a
May 7, 2011	Chek Lap Kok	Hong Kong	AsiaWorld–Arena	—N/a	—N/a	—N/a
May 9, 2011	Singapore		Singapore Indoor Stadium	—N/a	—N/a	—N/a
May 11, 2011	Jakarta	Indonesia	Kartika Expo Center	—N/a	—N/a	—N/a
May 13, 2011	Taipei	Taiwan	TWTC Nangang Exhibition Hall	—N/a	—N/a	—N/a
North America
May 27, 2011 (Note: The May 27, 2011 concert in Paradise Island was part of "Atlantis Live")	Paradise Island	The Bahamas	Atlantis Grand Ballroom	—N/a	—N/a	—N/a
May 28, 2011 (Note: The May 28, 2011 concert in St. Petersburg was part of the "Tampa Bay Rays Summer Concert Series")	St. Petersburg	United States	Tropicana Field	—N/a	—N/a	—N/a
South America
July 18, 2011	Caracas	Venezuela	Terraza del C.C.C.T.	Sonica	2,217 / 6,000 (37%)	$510,884
July 20, 2011	Lima	Peru	Explanada del Monumental	—N/a	5,189 / 10,000 (52%)	$348,633
July 22, 2011	Santiago	Chile	Movistar Arena	—N/a	8,844 / 14,320 (62%)	$439,345
July 24, 2011	Buenos Aires	Argentina	Microestadio Malvinas Argentinas	Cirse	6,638 / 6,680 (99%)	$462,151
July 27, 2011 (Note: On July 26, 2011, Lavigne got stuck at Ezeiza Airport in Buenos Aires due to a volcano, almost making her cancel the July 27 concert in São Paulo. However, she was able to arrive in Brazil just four hours before the concert time.)	São Paulo	Brazil	Credicard Hall	—N/a	13,347 / 14,108 (95%)	$980,009
July 28, 2011	São Paulo	Brazil	Credicard Hall	—N/a	13,347 / 14,108 (95%)	$980,009
July 31, 2011	Rio de Janeiro	Brazil	Citibank Hall	—N/a	7,725 / 7,784 (99%)	$591,976
August 2, 2011	Belo Horizonte	Brazil	Chevrolet Hall	—N/a	5,186 / 5,500 (94%)	$386,743
August 4, 2011	Brasília	Brazil	Nilson Nelson Gymnasium	—N/a	5,038 / 9,000 (56%)	$397,879
Asia
August 13, 2011 (Note: The August 13 and 14, 2011 concerts were part of "Summer Sonic Festival")	Chiba	Japan	QVC Marine Field	—N/a	—N/a	—N/a
August 14, 2011	Osaka	Japan	Maishima Sports Island	—N/a	—N/a	—N/a
Europe
September 4, 2011	Moscow	Russia	Dvorets Sporta Megasport	—N/a	—N/a	—N/a
September 5, 2011	Saint Petersburg	Russia	Yubileyny Sports Palace	—N/a	—N/a	—N/a
September 8, 2011	Turin	Italy	Palasport Olimpico	—N/a	—N/a	—N/a
September 10, 2011	Rome	Italy	PalaLottomatica	—N/a	—N/a	—N/a
September 11, 2011	Milan	Italy	Mediolanum Forum	—N/a	—N/a	—N/a
September 13, 2011	Amsterdam	Netherlands	Heineken Music Hall	MakeBelieve	—N/a	—N/a
September 14, 2011	Brussels	Belgium	Forest National	Vienna	—N/a	—N/a
September 16, 2011	Paris	France	Parc Georges-Valbon	—N/a	—N/a	—N/a
September 17, 2011	Paris	France	Zénith de Paris	—N/a	—N/a	—N/a
September 19, 2011	Cologne	Germany	Palladium	—N/a	—N/a	—N/a
September 21, 2011	London	England	HMV Hammersmith Apollo	Lawson	—N/a	—N/a
September 22, 2011	London	England	HMV Hammersmith Apollo	Lawson	—N/a	—N/a
September 23, 2011	Manchester	England	O_{2} Manchester Apollo	Lawson	—N/a	—N/a
North America
October 1, 2011	Victoria	Canada	Save-On-Foods Memorial Centre	—N/a	—N/a	—N/a
October 3, 2011	Vancouver	Canada	Rogers Arena	—N/a	—N/a	—N/a
October 5, 2011	Prince George	Canada	CN Centre	—N/a	—N/a	—N/a
October 6, 2011	Kamloops	Canada	Interior Savings Centre	—N/a	—N/a	—N/a
October 8, 2011	Kelowna	Canada	Prospera Place	—N/a	—N/a	—N/a
October 10, 2011	Edmonton	Canada	Rexall Place	—N/a	5,484 / 9,037 (61%)	$200,017
October 11, 2011	Calgary	Canada	Scotiabank Saddledome	—N/a	—N/a	—N/a
October 13, 2011	Regina	Canada	Brandt Centre	—N/a	—N/a	—N/a
October 14, 2011	Winnipeg	Canada	MTS Centre	—N/a	—N/a	—N/a
October 16, 2011	Sudbury	Canada	Sudbury Community Arena	—N/a	—N/a	—N/a
October 17, 2011	Ottawa	Canada	Scotiabank Place	—N/a	—N/a	—N/a
October 19, 2011	Moncton	Canada	Moncton Coliseum	—N/a	1,988 / 2,580 (77%)	$95,825
October 20, 2011	Halifax	Canada	Halifax Metro Centre	—N/a	3,320 / 3,493 (95%)	$162,175
October 22, 2011	London	Canada	John Labatt Centre	—N/a	4,934 / 5,716 (86%)	$199,784
October 24, 2011	Toronto	Canada	Air Canada Centre	—N/a	6,383 / 6,383 (100%)	$297,092
October 25, 2011	Montreal	Canada	Bell Centre	—N/a	3,809 / 4,790 (80%)	$185,384
December 7, 2011 (Note: The December 7, 2011 concert in Philadelphia was part of "Q102's Jingle Ball".)	Philadelphia	United States	Wells Fargo Center	—N/a	—N/a	—N/a
December 10, 2011 (Note: The December 10, 2011 concert in Sunrise was part of "Y100's Jingle Ball")	Sunrise	United States	BankAtlantic Center	—N/a	12,622 / 12,622 (100%)	$1,820,730
December 13, 2011 (Note: The December 13, 2011 concert in Lake Buena Vista was part of "XL 106.7's XLent Xmas")	Lake Buena Vista	United States	House of Blues	—N/a	—N/a	—N/a
Asia
February 4, 2012 (Note: The dates on February 4–6 and 8-9, 2012, in Japan were originally scheduled to take place in May 2011, but were rescheduled due to the 2011 Tōhoku earthquake and tsunami.)	Saitama	Japan	Saitama Super Arena	—N/a	—N/a	—N/a
February 5, 2012	Saitama	Japan	Saitama Super Arena	—N/a	—N/a	—N/a
February 6, 2012	Nagoya	Japan	Nippon Gaishi Hall	—N/a	—N/a	—N/a
February 8, 2012	Fukuoka	Japan	Marine Messe Fukuoka	—N/a	—N/a	—N/a
February 9, 2012	Osaka	Japan	Osaka-Jo Hall	—N/a	—N/a	—N/a
February 11, 2012	Guangzhou	China	Guangzhou Gymnasium	—N/a	—N/a	—N/a
February 14, 2012	Beijing	China	Wukesong Culture & Sports Center	—N/a	—N/a	—N/a
February 16, 2012	Quezon City	Philippines	Smart Araneta Coliseum	Somedaydream	—N/a	—N/a
February 18, 2012	Kuala Lumpur	Malaysia	Stadium Merdeka	—N/a	—N/a	—N/a
Total					80,102 / 105,391 (78%)	$5,257,897
