= Push (Avril Lavigne song) =

Single by Avril Lavigne

from the album Goodbye Lullaby
- Released: February 13, 2012
- Studio: Mr. Biz Studio (Los Angeles, CA)
- Genre: Rock
- Length: 3:01
- Label: Epic
- Songwriters: Avril Lavigne; Evan Taubenfeld
- Producer: Deryck Whibley

Avril Lavigne singles chronology
"Wish You Were Here" (2011)	"Push" (2012)	"Here's to Never Growing Up" (2013)

"Push" is a song by Canadian singer-songwriter Avril Lavigne, recorded for her fourth studio album, Goodbye Lullaby. It was written by Lavigne and Evan Taubenfeld, and its producer was Deryck Whibley. It was released as the promotional single in Japan on February 13, 2012, peaking at number 35 on the Billboard Japan Hot 100 chart. The song has received positive reviews.

== Background ==
On March 24, 2011, Avril asked her followers from Twitter which song should be the second single of Goodbye Lullaby, "Push" or "Smile". Then later, in the Polish version of the official site of the singer, it was announced that the chosen would be "Smile", which was released worldwide on May 6 of the same year. It reached the top five positions in countries like China, Turkey, Belgium and Japan. After the distribution of "Smile", the chosen as a focus of promotion of the album was "Wish You Were Here", managed a moderate commercial performance. It served as the last song of the album. "Push" until then had not received release, until that Epic Records, Lavigne's new label after leaving RCA, decided to release the same as promotional single digitally on Japanese territory, which happened on February 13, 2012. The CD edition was released on June 3, 2011.

== Musical style and lyrics ==
"Push" is a rock song. "Push" lyrics are about relationships. According to the sheet music published by Universal Music Publishing Group, the song is set in the time signature moderated with a metronome of 72 beats per minute. It was composed in the key of B-flat major with a vocal range that varies between the low note of Sol until the high note of Do. It consists in using vocals and piano chords and guitar. The lyrics were written by former guitarist of Lavigne, along with singer.

== Critical reception ==
The song received positive reviews. In the Diário do Grande ABC, Thiago Mariano said that "What the Hell", "Push", "Smile" and "Stop Standing There" are the liveliest tracks and Goodbye Lullaby is the first thing to leave Lavigne more committed to their music. In The New York Times, Jon Pareles said that Lavigne "is keeping distant from R&B styles and current dance music and opted for an unexpected prototype: a teenage star, fellow Canadian who grew up, Alanis Morissette, in addition to showing other references of his songs with Alanis, among them "Push" and "Darlin".

== Credits and personnel ==
Credits and personnel are adapted from the Goodbye Lullaby album liner notes.

- Avril Lavigne – writer, vocals
- Evan Taubenfeld – writer, engineering, digital engineering, editing, bridge vocals
- Deryck Whibley – producer, mixing, engineering, all instruments
- Ted Jensen – mastering

== Charts ==
Peak chart positions of "Push"
Chart (2012)	Peak position
Japan Hot 100 (Billboard)	35
