= Wish You Were Here (Avril Lavigne song) =

2011 single by Avril Lavigne

Single by Avril Lavigne

from the album Goodbye Lullaby
- B-side: "Smile" (Acoustic Version)
- Released: September 9, 2011
- Recorded: 2010
- Studio: Maratone, Stockholm
- Genre: Pop rock
- Length: 3:45
- Label: RCA
- Songwriters: Avril Lavigne; Max Martin; Shellback
- Producers: Max Martin; Shellback

Avril Lavigne singles chronology
"Smile" (2011)	"Wish You Were Here" (2011)	"Push" (2012)

Music video
- "Wish You Were Here" on YouTube

"Wish You Were Here" is a song by Canadian singer-songwriter Avril Lavigne from her fourth studio album, Goodbye Lullaby (2011). The song was released on September 9, 2011, by RCA Records as the third and final single from the album. "Wish You Were Here" was written by Lavigne along with the song's producers Max Martin and Shellback. According to Lavigne, the song shows her vulnerable side. Critical reception toward the song was positive, with critics praising it as a highlight on the album.

The accompanying music video for "Wish You Were Here" was directed by Dave Meyers and it premiered on September 9, 2011. Lavigne described the video as different from her previous work. Upon its release on the Internet, it received mixed to positive reviews from music critics who praised Lavigne's portrayal of emotions, and described it as dark. She further added "Wish You Were Here" to the set list of her tour, The Black Star Tour.

== Background and release ==
"Wish You Were Here" is written by Lavigne, Max Martin, and Shellback, while produced by the latter two. It was recorded at Maratone Studios in Stockholm, Sweden. In a telephone interview with The Caprice, Lavigne confirmed that the song would serve as the third and possibly last single from Goodbye Lullaby. During an interview with Artistdirect, Lavigne said that the song showed her vulnerable side.

In an interview with MTV News, she stated that the song is the perfect tune for anyone who's not able to be with the ones they love this holiday season. "I’m excited about 'Wish You Were Here' being the single because it's a ballad and the song kind of represents the album definitely more so than the first single," she told MTV News about the song, which she performed during the Macy's Thanksgiving Day Parade last week. "That was kind of more my older stuff and more pop rock and aggressive and a lighter subject. Goodbye Lullaby, for me, was a record that I was writing for myself." Lavigne also described her meeting with Martin and the work on "Wish You Were Here":

"He said some really kind things that really meant a lot to me. He worked with so many people and he's an artist, he's very sensitive. We wrote a couple really special songs together. It's kind of hard to work with someone new, and when I went in and did vocals on 'Wish You Were Here', I did my first take, and then Max stood up and was like, 'I'm so honored that you're here.' And it was a really special moment, where he understood me and I understood him. We connected and had a really great time. And it was really magic my first trip there."

== Composition ==
"Wish You Were Here"
A 26 second sample of the song's chorus, which features Lavigne's vulnerable side and how bad she wishes her boyfriend to be there beside her.

"Wish You Were Here" was described as a midtempo pop rock power ballad, while featuring soaring strings, piano and drum kits. The lyrics talk about missing someone and something we all go through in our lives.

In an interview with MTV News, Lavigne described the song as the most personal track on the album. "It was more raw and stripped-down and more emotional and I wasn't holding back," she said of working on the album. "[It's] sort of more song driven and the production was mainly just like a lot of acoustic guitars and loops and just all about the vocal; the vocal being clear and having an honest emotion to it. And saying that, yeah, the first two singles ['What the Hell' and 'Smile'] were more pop rock, and so now finally with this one, 'Wish You Were Here', being released, it feels right."

The song comes from a place deep inside and is very much about someone in Lavigne's life. "I love this song. I like this song because I wrote it about missing somebody and that's something that we all go through at some point in our lives," she explained. "It's just about looking back and remembering all those good times you shared with somebody, all the crazy moments. And that's life. We all experience that at some point, but it has a positive message."

== Critical reception ==
"Wish You Were Here" received largely positive reviews from critics. Jody Rosen, writing for Rolling Stone magazine, described "Wish You Were Here" as a "jangling power ballad". Stephen Thomas Erlewine from Allmusic marked "Wish You Were Here" as a highlight of the album, Goodbye Lullaby. Al Fox, an editor of BBC Music, said that the song is one of the tracks from the album where "Lavigne actually manages to communicate some real sentiment". He also commented that it is "an unassuming strum-along". Bill Lamb of the website About.com found "interesting arrangements and musical settings" in the song. While reviewing Goodbye Lullaby, Robert Copsey of Digital Spy concluded that the main theme of the song was based on the lines "I can be tough, I can be strong/ But with you it's not like that at all" and talked about Lavigne's divorce. He further put the song in his list of "Possible future singles".

On a more negative note, Mikael Wood of Spin magazine wrote that, in songs like "Wish You Were Here" and "Everybody Hurts", the "former brat-punk princess in dreary woe-is-me mode" can be found. According to Jonathan Keefe of Slant Magazine, this song, along with others from Goodbye Lullaby, "mistake having a potty mouth for having an actual personality", stating it "fails to pass off 'Damn, damn, damn / What I'd do to have you here, here, here' as a hook".

== Chart performance ==
Even before being released as a single, the song peaked at number 99 on the Billboard Hot 100 and at number 64 on the Canadian Hot 100 on the week of the album's release. Upon release to radio stations, the song entered the US Billboard Hot 100 Airplay at number 69 on November 13, 2011, has peaked at 32, and re-entered the Canadian Hot 100 on November 19, 2011, at number 98. It re-entered the Billboard Hot 100 at 84 and peaked at 65. The song has sold over 500,000 units of digital copies in the USA. It was never released on radio in the UK, Germany and some other European countries.

== Music video ==
=== Background and synopsis ===
"It's a song written about missing someone and looking back and remembering all the good times and all those awesome moments. The song is 'stripped down. It's kind of raw, but also emotional. I cry in the video and that was something that I did on purpose, but it was something that was real."

— Avril Lavigne talking about "Wish You Were Here" with Billboard

On August 9, on her official website, Lavigne posted pictures from the shooting of the music video for "Wish You Were Here", one of a red flower, and another of her lying on a wooden floor. Lavigne said that the video will be very raw and exposed, unlike her previous videos "What the Hell" and "Smile". Dave Meyers was the director of the video. On September 8, Lavigne posted on her Twitter and Facebook accounts "My music video for 'Wish You Were Here' is coming out tomorrow (and the tears are real... no onions!!)" confirming that the video will be posted on September 9. She further described the video, "It's simple but emotional. Raw and real. Stripped down." The video premiered on Lavigne's VEVO channel on September 8. It begins with her lying on a wooden floor wearing a black dress and barefoot, surrounded by leaves. She rises, and begins to sing. Lavigne picks up a red flower and begins picking off the petals. She sets the flower on fire, and waves it in the air. As she continues singing, she starts to cry. Towards the bridge of the song, Lavigne is shown lying in a bathtub. She submerges herself, then suddenly rises, and steps out. Lavigne continues to sing, and steps towards the sunlight from a nearby window.

=== Reception ===
Shows Lavigne alone with a flower.

A writer for the magazine Billboard simply called the video "dark". Leah Greenblatt of Entertainment Weekly said that Lavigne could have worn waterproof mascara in the video but she concluded that it "wouldn't be quite as cinematic." Writing for AOL, Marina Galperina concluded "Unlike other recent videos 'What the Hell' and 'Smile,' this latest cut from the Goodbye Lullaby album is a bit somber." Melinda Newman of HitFix concluded that Lavigne "looks beautifully anguished, but that's a lot of screen time and focus for any one artist to try to carry off." However, she added that the video doesn't "look as awkward as she did in the horrible video for 'What The Hell.'" Amy Sciarretto of Pop Crush said: "It's a somber video with Avril as the only star, in a sad, dark place. It certainly resonates, though! Even a perky pop star like Avril Lavigne is not immune to sadness that comes with separation."

According to Derek Johnson of Long Island Press was "heating up the Internet" with one million views on YouTube because Lavigne "is showing another side to fans". Writing for Dose, Ottawa Citizen and The Vancouver Sun, Leah Collins gave the video a mixed review saying that Lavigne is "feeling a bit more mall-emo than mall-punk". She added that Lavigne used "pyromania in the opening scenes, torching a gerbera daisy while wanly singing of lost love" before concluding "What's an Avril video without at least one act of age-inappropriate mischief, anyway?". Pop Dust's Katherine St Asaph compared the scene where Lavigne is in the bathtub with the music video for Britney Spears' song "Everytime" but the two scenes have different meanings.

== Live performances ==
Lavigne performed the song on Good Morning America on November 22, 2011.

== Track listing ==
Digital download

1. "Wish You Were Here" – 3:45
2. "Wish You Were Here" (Acoustic Version) – 3:45

CD single

1. "Wish You Were Here" – 3:45
2. "Wish You Were Here" (Acoustic Version) - 3:45

Digital download (Deluxe Single)

1. "Wish You Were Here" – 3:45
2. "Wish You Were Here" (Acoustic Version) – 3:45
3. "Smile" (Acoustic Version) – 3:33
4. "Wish You Were Here" (Video)

Fan Edition CD Single

1. "Wish You Were Here" (Album Version) – 3:45
2. "Wish You Were Here" (Acoustic Version) – 3:45
3. "Smile" (Acoustic Version) – 3:34
4. "What the Hell" (Acoustic Version) – 3:40

== Credits and personnel ==
- Backing vocals, Lead vocals – Avril Lavigne
- Songwriting – Avril Lavigne, Max Martin, Shellback
- Production and recording – Max Martin, Shellback
- Engineering – Michael Ilbert
- Mixing – Serban Ghenea
- Mix engineer – John Hanes
- Assistant mix engineer – Tim Roberts
- Drums, guitar and bass – Shellback
- Keyboards – Max Martin

Credits adapted from Goodbye Lullaby album liner notes.

== Charts ==
=== Weekly charts ===
Chart (2011–12)	Peak position
Belgium (Ultratip Bubbling Under Flanders)	4
Belgium (Ultratip Bubbling Under Wallonia)	34
Brazil Hot 100 Airplay (Billboard Brasil)	34
Canada (Canadian Hot 100)	64
Hungary (Rádiós Top 40)	35
Italy (FIMI)	59
Japan Adult Contemporary Airplay (Billboard)	33
Japan (Japan Hot 100)	90
Lebanon (The Official Lebanese Top 20)	3
Philippines (Myx)	4
Russia Airplay (TopHit)	78
Slovakia Airplay (ČNS IFPI)	68
South Korea (Gaon Chart)	6
Ukraine Airplay (TopHit)	27
US Billboard Hot 100	65
US Adult Pop Airplay (Billboard)	20
US Pop Airplay (Billboard)	30

=== Year-end charts ===
2011 year-end chart performance for "Wish You Were Here"
Chart (2011)	Position
Ukraine Airplay (TopHit)	185

2012 year-end chart performance for "Wish You Were Here"
Chart (2012)	Position
Ukraine Airplay (TopHit)	94

== Release history ==
Region	Date	Format	Label
New Zealand	July 31, 2011	Radio airplay	Sony Music/RCA
Australia	September 9, 2011	Digital download	Sony Music/RCA
Austria	September 9, 2011	Digital download	Sony Music/RCA
Belgium	September 9, 2011	Digital download	Sony Music/RCA
Germany	September 9, 2011	Digital download	Sony Music/RCA
Ireland	September 9, 2011	Digital download	Sony Music/RCA
Italy	September 9, 2011	Digital download	Sony Music/RCA
Luxembourg	September 9, 2011	Digital download	Sony Music/RCA
Mexico	September 9, 2011	Digital download	Sony Music/RCA
Netherlands	September 9, 2011	Digital download	Sony Music/RCA
New Zealand	September 9, 2011	Digital download	Sony Music/RCA
Norway	September 9, 2011	Digital download	Sony Music/RCA
Switzerland	September 9, 2011	Digital download	Sony Music/RCA
France	September 12, 2011	Digital download	Sony Music/RCA
Australia	September 12, 2011	Radio airplay	Sony Music/RCA
Poland	September 12, 2011	Radio airplay	Sony Music/RCA
Finland	September 13, 2011	Digital download	Sony Music/RCA
Spain	September 13, 2011	Digital download	Sony Music/RCA
United Kingdom	October 23, 2011	Digital download	Epic Records
Belgium	October 31, 2011	Digital download (deluxe edition)	Sony Music/Epic Records
Canada	October 31, 2011	Digital download (deluxe edition)	Sony Music/Epic Records
France	October 31, 2011	Digital download (deluxe edition)	Sony Music/Epic Records
Greece	October 31, 2011	Digital download (deluxe edition)	Sony Music/Epic Records
Ireland	October 31, 2011	Digital download (deluxe edition)	Sony Music/Epic Records
Italy	October 31, 2011	Digital download (deluxe edition)	Sony Music/Epic Records
Luxembourg	October 31, 2011	Digital download (deluxe edition)	Sony Music/Epic Records
Netherlands	October 31, 2011	Digital download (deluxe edition)	Sony Music/Epic Records
Portugal	October 31, 2011	Digital download (deluxe edition)	Sony Music/Epic Records
Spain	October 31, 2011	Digital download (deluxe edition)	Sony Music/Epic Records
Switzerland	October 31, 2011	Digital download (deluxe edition)	Sony Music/Epic Records
United Kingdom	October 31, 2011	Digital download (deluxe edition)	Sony Music/Epic Records
United States	October 31, 2011	Digital download (deluxe edition)	Sony Music/Epic Records
United States	November 1, 2011	Mainstream radio	Epic Records
