= Alice (Avril Lavigne song) =

2010 single by Avril Lavigne

Single by Avril Lavigne

from the album Almost Alice
- B-side: "Welcome to Mystery"
- Released: 27 January 2010
- Studio: Ruby Red Productions (Santa Monica, CA)
- Genre: Rock
- Length: 3:34; 5:10 (extended version)
- Label: Buena Vista
- Songwriter: Avril Lavigne
- Producer: Butch Walker

Avril Lavigne singles chronology
"The Best Damn Thing" (2008)	"Alice" (2010)	"What the Hell" (2011)

Music video
- "Alice" on YouTube

"Alice" is a song by Canadian singer-songwriter Avril Lavigne from the Alice in Wonderland film soundtrack Almost Alice (2010). It was released to radio as the lead single from the soundtrack on 27 January 2010, by Buena Vista Records. The song was solely written by Lavigne, whilst production was helmed by Butch Walker. An extended version of the song was featured as a hidden track on Lavigne's fourth studio album Goodbye Lullaby (2011). According to Lavigne, she is a big fan of the story of Alice's Adventures in Wonderland and she was greatly inspired by the 2010 film's imagery when she wrote the song.

"Alice" received mixed reviews from music critics. Some reviewers praised the lyrics and darker nature of the song, while others criticized Lavigne's vocals in the chorus. In the United States, the song peaked at number 71 on the Billboard Hot 100 chart. Internationally, the song was a top 40 hit in six countries. The song was particularly successful in Japan, where it peaked at number four on the Billboard Japan Hot 100 weekly chart and number 47 on the year-end chart. It was also certified Gold by the Recording Industry Association of Japan (RIAJ). "Alice" was first performed on The Tonight Show with Jay Leno and was regularly performed during Lavigne's Black Star Tour (2011–2012).

== Background ==
In January 2010, Lavigne was in a board meeting at the Disney offices going over clothing designs inspired by Alice in Wonderland for her Abbey Dawn line, when she mentioned to the executives that she was writing music for her upcoming album and would love to write a song for the film's soundtrack. Discussions between Lavigne's manager and film executives took place, and director Tim Burton agreed to let Lavigne write the song. Lavigne stated, "I got off the phone, sat down at my piano at home, wrote the song immediately; I was so inspired because I'd been designing for the movie [...] so I had all the images in my head." She played the song for Burton, who later called Lavigne to give his approval and confirm the song would be used for the film.

On his radio show, On Air with Ryan Seacrest, Seacrest called the story a "great lesson," telling his listeners "you ask for what you want. You gotta go for it, because if you didn't ask for it, then you wouldn't have gotten [the opportunity]." "Alice" was premiered on Seacrest's radio show on 27 January, when Lavigne made a surprise visit to the studio. Lavigne described the song as different from her previous work, calling it "a little darker."

The song was played over the film's end credits, and went on to sell 45,000 copies within the first four weeks of its release.

== Composition ==
"Alice" is a moderately fast rock ballad at 120 beats per minute performed in the key of G major. Lavigne's vocal range spans from G3 to F5. Guitar and piano accompany Lavigne's vocals.

== Critical reception ==
Professional ratings
Review scores
Source	Rating
Calgary Herald	(positive)
Digital Spy	(favorable)
411mania.com	2/5 stars
Idolator	(mixed)
Los Angeles Times	(mixed)

In his review for the soundtrack Almost Alice, William Ruhlmann of Allmusic described "Alice" as "a typical piece of self-assertive adolescent pop/rock", noting that it was "ideally suited for heavy rotation on Radio Disney". Todd Martens, writing for the Los Angeles Times, approved of the song's "darker, more angsty vision", adding that it was a return to Lavigne's sound in Under My Skin. He described the beginning of the song as, "promising, with wavy synths caught somewhere between a nightmare and a dream".

The Calgary Herald wrapped its opinion of "Alice" in succinct praise, calling it "one of the best songs of Avril's career", adding that Avril's repertoire does not otherwise live up to its hype. Digital Spy's Nick Levine called the song "a big angsty rock ballad", finding the track "cinematic" and at times "ghostly", before mentioning that the song took several listens to appreciate.

Several critics focused on the lyrics of the song, with mixed reaction. Becky Bain of Idolator began her review commending Lavigne's lyrics for "carry[ing] genuine sentiment," believing that her "words of encouragement" would "resonate" with her teenage fans. Mark Ingoldsby, of 411mania.com, had little to praise in Lavigne's lyrics, stating that Lavigne is "[a]pparently incapable of crafting witty lyrics that paint an interesting picture through creative metaphors." Martens had similar feelings, writing, "[The] listener never really gets a picture of [the] trippy world Lavigne has found herself in."

There was general consensus among critics regarding the chorus of the song, in which Lavigne repeatedly holds a high note for an extended period. Ingoldsby sub-titled his review "Wail of a Fail", but although he could appreciate the beginning of the song, calling it "eerie and captivating" and describing Lavigne's voice as "unremarkable, yet pleasant", he found the rest of the song – from "the second part of the first verse" onwards – to be a "recreation of an Alanis Morissette-style spaz-out session". Bain was also unimpressed with the chorus. "[The] biggest problem with the song is that Lavigne, trying to come off like Amy Lee, is constantly screeching while attempting to hit those high notes. It's difficult to enjoy a song while you're wincing during the chorus." Story Gilmore of Neonlimelight.com reviewed Lavigne's live performance on the Tonight Show with Jay Leno. He described the performance as "toned down" and stated that Lavigne showed vocal growth during the performance, "easily shifting from full voice to high notes".

As of October 2011, Alice had sold 373,000 digital copies in the US.

=== Accolades ===
Award/Publisher	Year	Category	Result	Ref.
Billboard Japan Music Awards	2010	Adult Contemporany of the Year	Nominated	
MTV Video Music Awards Japan	2011	Best Karaokee! Song	Nominated	
MTV Video Music Awards Japan	2011	Best Video From a Film	Won	
MuchMusic Video Awards	2010	International Video of the Year By A Canadian	Nominated	
MuchMusic Video Awards	2010	UR Fave: Video	Nominated	
Nickelodeon Mexico Kids' Choice Awards	2010	Favorite Song	Nominated	
Satellite Awards	2010	Best Original Song	Nominated	

== Commercial performance ==
In Canada, "Alice" debuted at number 51 on the Canadian Hot 100, where it spent three weeks on the chart In the United States, "Alice" debuted at number 71 on the US Billboard Hot 100, and it spent three weeks on the chart. In the United Kingdom, the song debuted at number 59 on the UK Official Singles Chart, and spent three weeks on the chart. In Australia, "Alice" managed to debut on the top forty on the ARIA Singles Chart at number 39, and left the chart the next week. In Japan, "Alice" had commercial success where it debuted on the top five on the Japan Hot 100 where it peaked at number four. As of October 2011, "Alice" had sold 373,000 digital copies in the US Overall "Alice" debuted on the top forty in six countries.

== Music video ==
=== Background ===
Lavigne shot the music video for "Alice" on 26–27 January 2010. The video was directed by Dave Meyers, which was partly filmed at the Los Angeles Arboretum. Meyers worked closely with Lavigne to create the video. His intention was to capture "the haunting quality of the song" on video and present it with a gothic feel. Lavigne wanted to include piano sequences to stress the instrument's contribution to the song. Footage from Burton's Alice in Wonderland was edited prominently into the video.

The video premiered online on 17 February 2010.

=== Synopsis ===
Lavigne sings while sitting at the Mad Hatter's tea party, her "echo" appearing in the corner.

The music video opens with Lavigne following a White Rabbit into a forest. As the piano in the soundtrack begins playing, the video briefly cuts to Lavigne's hands playing the notes on a piano. The video returns to Lavigne's character, who trips and falls into a hole near a large tree. Her fall is intercut with shots of Alice (from Burton's film) colliding with objects, including a piano. When Lavigne opens her eyes, she is lying at the bottom of a deep hole, dressed in a black gothic corset dress and stockings imprinted with playing card suits.

When Lavigne climbs out of the hole, she notices a caterpillar crawling past and finds herself in Wonderland. The song enters the chorus, and the video cuts and dissolves between Lavigne's character running through the forest and Lavigne singing and performing the song on the piano. The only Wonderland character to make an appearance at this point is a fleeting glimpse of the Cheshire Cat.

She arrives at a tea party, and the Mad Hatter (Johnny Depp) stands, welcoming her with open arms. The scene is edited with footage of the Mad Hatter from Burton's film. As Lavigne sinks into a chair singing, her lyrical "echo" is visually emphasized with her face quickly dissolving in and out. As the verse ends, Lavigne stands and runs away from the scene. The chorus of the song returns to shots of Lavigne running through the forest, arriving at a piano surrounded by giant mushrooms. The video cuts between shots of Lavigne playing the instrument and singing, eventually showing Lavigne running through a misty copse of bamboo trees. Various scenes from the film are shown in succession, before Lavigne is reintroduced running toward an opening in the forest. As she exits the forest, she is dressed in her normal clothing.

== Live performances ==
Lavigne first performed "Alice" on 3 March 2010 during an appearance on The Tonight Show with Jay Leno.

== Track listings and formats ==
- Digital download
1. "Alice" – 3:34
- CD single
1. "Alice" – 3:34
2. "Welcome to Mystery" (performed by Plain White T's) – 4:27

== Credits and personnel ==
Credits and personnel are adapted from the Goodbye Lullaby album liner notes.

- Avril Lavigne – vocals, writer, piano
- Butch Walker – producer, all instruments
- Jake Sinclair – engineering
- Deryck Whibley – mixing
- Ted Jensen – mastering

== Charts and certifications ==
=== Charts ===
Chart (2010)	Peak position
Australia (ARIA)	39
Austria (Ö3 Austria Top 40)	19
Belgium (Ultratip Bubbling Under Flanders)	19
Canada (Canadian Hot 100)	51
Croatia International Airplay (HRT)	2
Czech Republic (IFPI)	24
European Hot 100 Singles	54
Germany (Media Control Charts)	27
Japan (Japan Hot 100)	4
Mexico Anglo (Monitor Latino)	6
Netherlands (Dutch Top 40 Tipparade Chart)	11
Netherlands (MegaCharts)	99
Scotland (Scottish Singles Chart)	55
Slovakia (Slovak Airplay Chart)	58
Spain (PROMUSICAE)	43
South Korea (Gaon International Chart)	6
Switzerland (Swiss Singles Chart)	73
UK Singles (OCC)	59
US Billboard Hot 100	71

=== Certifications ===
Region	Certification	Certified units/sales
Japan (RIAJ) Full-length ringtone	Gold	100,000^{*}
^{*} Sales figures based on certification alone.

=== Year-end charts ===
Chart (2010)	Position
Croatia International Airplay (HRT)	59
Japanese Adult Contemporary Chart	10
Japanese Digital Track Chart	47

== Release history ==
Region	Date	Label	Format
North America	27 January 2010	Buena Vista	Radio premiere
North America	29 January 2010	Buena Vista	Digital download
Australia	27 February 2010	Buena Vista	Digital download
Europe	28 February 2010	Walt Disney (Europe)	Digital download
Germany	5 March 2010	Walt Disney (Europe)	CD single
