= Sonica =

- Origin: Caracas, Venezuela
- Genres: Pop punk, skate punk, powerpop
- Years active: 1998 - present
- Members: Iván Infante; Marco Ramos; Martin Imhof; María Imhof
- Past members: JC Calderón; Gilbert Lugo; Gustavo Ramón; Ricardo Sosa; Leo Borges

Sonica is a Venezuelan rock band formed in Caracas. Their members are Iván Infante, Marco Ramos, Martin Imhof and María Imhof.

Active since 1998, Sonica has released two studio albums, Tarde o Temprano (Sooner or Later) and lo que escribo sobre ti (what i write about you). The band has become popular among Venezuelans.

== Biographical summary ==
In 1998, Martín Imhof decided to start a punk band influenced by the sounds of the California punk, very popular bands like NOFX, The Offspring, Green Day, among others. With him in the drums, his sister María Imhof took the guitar. The band was complete when his friend Peruvian Gustavo Ramón joined as the lead guitar, Jean Carlo Calderón on vocals and Gilbert Lugo on bass. Their first years passed in the underground scene of Caracas. Their sound and their songs were really new for the bands in the country at that time, gradually adding fans and good critics.

The original lineup would last several years, until 2005, when Gilbert Lugo and Nelson Porras left the band being replaced by Ricardo Sosa and Leonardo Borges. By this time, the band had recorded several video clips (El Niño-The Kid-, Perfecto-Perfect- and ¿Cuánto me Cuesta?-How much will it Cost?-) and had interviews and appearances for various magazines, TV and radio. With its new lineup they recorded the video for the song ¿Por Qué?-Why?-, which was highly acclaimed by fans, turning the song into one of the most popular of them. Their first album, Tarde o Temprano, were released in that year. The title refers the fact that it took 7 years to come up. The band's sound also changed, moving to a much happier punk playing sentimental themes like love and relationships. Since this time the band has a lot of detractors, criticizing their music as they thought that was too light and commercial, and therefore did not identify the ideology of punk.

One year later, in 2006, the band would suffer another departure when JC Calderon left the band. Ricardo Sosa, lead guitar at that time, also took the vocals. For two years they did several shows, among which there were two being openers of foreign bands like the Mexicans Panda and Allison, and record what would become their second studio album, lo que escribo sobre ti, released in 2007. Again, the band has a change in his music, going from punk to the alternative rock. Also in this year they would give their first performances abroad, visiting Colombia, Mexico, Brazil and Argentina and represented Venezuela in the reality show on MTV Latinamerica, Rally MTV.

In 2009, Ricardo Sosa and Leo Borges left the band. María and Martín, the only members of the original lineup that started in 1998, managed to complete the current line-up with Ivan Infante on guitar and Marco Ramos on bass and vocals. In a statement on its official facebook profile they announced their plans to launch a new video clip and a new album for 2010. They opened a concert in Caracas on July 18 (2011) for pop-punk singer-songwriter Avril Lavigne, during her "The Black Star Tour".

== Members ==
- Iván Infante (Guitar)
- Marco Ramos (Bass/Vocals)
- Martín Imhof (Drums)
- María Imhof (Guitar/Back vocals)

== Discography ==
- Tarde o Temprano-Sooner or Later- (2005).
- lo que escribo sobre ti-what i write about you- (2007).
- Once-Eleven- (2011).
