= What the Hell =

2011 single by Avril Lavigne

Single by Avril Lavigne

from the album Goodbye Lullaby
- B-side: "Alice"
- Released: 10 January 2011
- Recorded: 2010
- Studio: Maratone, Stockholm
- Genre: Bubblegum; pop-punk; synth-pop; new wave; rock
- Length: 3:39
- Label: RCA
- Songwriters: Avril Lavigne; Max Martin; Shellback
- Producers: Max Martin; Shellback

Avril Lavigne singles chronology
"Alice" (2010)	"What the Hell" (2011)	"Smile" (2011)

Music video
- "What the Hell" on YouTube

"What the Hell" is a song by the Canadian singer-songwriter Avril Lavigne from her fourth studio album, Goodbye Lullaby (2011). Lavigne wrote the song with its producers, Max Martin and Shellback. RCA Records released it as the album's lead single on January 10, 2011. Backed by an instrumentation of guitars, keyboards, and hand-claps, the song has lyrics about personal freedom and self-expression.

Upon its release, "What the Hell" received positive reviews from music critics with many complimenting its catchiness and comparing it to her 2007 single "Girlfriend". The song was successful, reaching number one in Japan, the top five in Asia, the top ten in Europe, Australia, South America, Mexico, Canada, and the top 20 in the US and the UK.

An accompanying music video for the song was directed by Marcus Raboy and premiered on 23 January. "What the Hell" was performed by Lavigne on several television programs such as Dick Clark's New Year's Rockin' Eve, T4, The View, The Tonight Show with Jay Leno, Britain's Got Talent and the Much Music Video Awards. Additionally, she added the song to the setlist of the Black Star Tour (2011).

== Background ==
"What the Hell" is written by Lavigne, Max Martin, and Shellback, while the latter two produced the song. It was recorded at Maratone Studios in Stockholm, Sweden. This is the second song these three have written together, the first one being Miranda Cosgrove's "Dancing Crazy". In November 2010, Lavigne announced via a blog on her official website that her fourth album, Goodbye Lullaby, had been completed for a year and cited her record company as the reason for the album's delays. She revealed in the blog that "What the Hell" would be the first single from the album. The song was premiered on 31 December 2010 on Dick Clark's New Year's Rockin' Eve during a pre-taped segment along with a performance of "Girlfriend". Lavigne described "What the Hell" as "a really fun, upbeat party song, so it worked out really well to play it for the first time on New Year's Rockin' Eve." The following day, "What the Hell" was available as a free download for 48 hours from Lavigne's official Facebook page.

== Composition ==
"What the Hell" has been described as a "bubblegum pop-punk", synthpop, and "new-wave rock" song. The song has been compared to previous Lavigne's single, "Girlfriend" (2007). It is written in the verse–pre-chorus–chorus form. The track opens with its characteristically "retro keyboard riff" and hand-claps. The inclusion of the keyboard has drawn comparisons to the garage rock genre and the band The Hives. The song also features guitars during the chorus. The song is performed in the key of A major at a tempo of 150 beats per minute. Avril Lavigne's vocals span from F#_{3} to F#_{5}.

Although Lavigne simply described the song as "a broad message about personal freedom", critics have interpreted it in various ways. Gil Kaufman of MTV.com suggested that it is a "declaration of independence from a former teen star who is storming back onto the scene". Kaufman proposed Lavigne's public divorce from Sum 41 singer Deryck Whibley, along with friction between her and her record company, as possible themes. Jody Rosen of Rolling Stone magazine called the song "an anthem about a good girl... staying out late, swapping boys and exacting psychological revenge." Heather McDaid of Stereoboard.com was critical of the song's theme being about Whibley: "with such an upbeat song it's hard to envisage divorce as the underlying subject matter as you listen." Holly Thomas of Frost Magazine suggested Lavigne was "starved of affection from the one she truly loves." Lavigne described the song as "more reminiscent of some of my old pop rock stuff", calling it her "most pop track on the record" and the least personal song from the album.

== Reception ==
=== Critical reception ===
Professional ratings
Review scores
Source	Rating
Blogcritics	(positive)
Digital Spy	5/5 stars
Frost Magazine	(positive)
Idolator	(positive)
MTV	(positive)
Rolling Stone	3.5/5 stars
Stereoboard.com	(mixed)

"What the Hell" has received positive reviews from music critics, who have noted similarities between "What the Hell" and Lavigne's previous single, "Girlfriend". Gil Kaufman of MTV.com stated "What the Hell" has "rousing cheerleader energy" and an "infectious groove and peppy vibe". Jody Rosen of Rolling Stone magazine said "the music is easily some of Avril's catchiest yet", describing it as "Avril in a nutshell". Idolator described the song as a "guilty pleasure" and called it "the kind of track we only select after double-checking no one's eyeing our iPod." Nick Levine of Digital Spy gave the song a perfect rating. He explained that Lavigne is "snottier than a tissue tossed in the bin down the flu clinic [but] what's more, she's pulling it off." Levine added that "What the Hell" was not "quite as undeniable" as "Girlfriend" but praised the chorus of the song.

Heather McDaid of Stereoboard.com notes that it "isn't a revolutionary piece musically but it encompasses the pop-rock sound Avril has been creating over the years". McDaid goes on to say that it is "definitely a song that reflects the older, more fun loving Avril Lavigne." Holly Thomas of Frost Magazine believed that the song lacked maturity and described it as "irritating", but she praised the song for its lyrics and theme. Kirsten Coachman of Blogcritics simply said that people could easily relate to it.

McDaid and Thomas all agreed that some might find the song annoying. Jonathan Keefe from Slant Magazine was more positive: "Martin ensures that lead single "What the Hell" explodes into its chorus to great effect, making its slight refrain of "All my life I've been good/But now I'm thinking 'what the hell'" sound more massive than it probably should". Andy Greenwald from Entertainment Weekly was almost neutral in his review, but admitted that the "Farfisa-fueled What the Hell [will] restore Avril to her rightful place ahead of Katy Perry and Ke$ha in the Sisterhood of the Negligible Pants". Stephen Thomas Erlewine from AllMusic picked the track as one of the best of the album: "'What the Hell' approximates Avril's irrepressible brattiness only without seeming much fun at all".

=== Accolades ===
Key
†	Indicates non-competitive categories

Award/Publisher	Year	Category	Result	Ref.
Billboard Japan Music Awards	2011	Hot 100 Airplay of the Year	Won	
BMI London Awards	2012	Award-Winning Songs †	Won	
BMI Pop Music Awards	2012	Award-Winning Songs †	Won	
MuchMusic Video Awards	2011	International Video of the Year by a Canadian	Nominated	
MuchMusic Video Awards	2011	UR Fave: Artist	Nominated	

== Live performances ==
Lavigne performed the song live several times. The first performance was on the Dick Clark's New Year's Rockin' Eve on 31 December 2010/1 January 2011. She performed it on Daybreak (UK) on 15 February 2011; on T4, BBC Radio 1, The View, Jimmy Kimmel Live!, at Walmart Soundcheck, and on The Tonight Show with Jay Leno on 14 March 2011; and on Sunrise on 31 March 2011, and on the Canadian premiation Much Music Video Awards on 19 June. On 1 June 2011, Lavigne performed the song on the fifth season of Britain's Got Talent as a medley with "Smile".

== Music video ==
The music video was filmed in December 2010 in Los Angeles. The video begins with Lavigne in her bra and panties lying in bed with her love interest, played by Spencer Hill. She gets out of the bed, applies her two fragrances, Black Star and Forbidden Rose, locks her love interest in a walk-in closet, and leaves the house. She walks down the road and steals a taxi. Lavigne's lover begins to chase her on a bike. She gets out of the taxi, which crashes into another vehicle. Lavigne stops to play in a basketball court with other men at the Sixth Street Viaduct. Her love interest finds her, and she runs into a vintage clothing store with an Abbey Dawn collection. Lavigne's mother, Judy, makes a cameo appearance as a clerk in the clothing store. Lavigne starts to grab various items of clothing, mainly pieces from Abbey Dawn. She changes, and walks through the store to a venue. Lavigne waits for her boyfriend in the corridor, and sings the bridge to him. She then runs to the stage and begins performing the final chorus with her band. She stage dives, and finds her love interest in the crowd. The video ends with Lavigne and her lover again lying in bed as she winks at the camera. The video was directed by Marcus Raboy and recorded in 3D. It made its television debut on 23 January 2011, on ABC Family and on UK music channel 4Music. Mawuse Ziegbe of MTV said, "Avril Lavigne is officially back, and if her latest video 'What The Hell' is anything to go by, she's still brimming with the pop-punk spunk that made her a superstar nearly a decade ago."

== Track listing ==
- Digital download
1. "What the Hell" – 3:39
- CD single
1. "What the Hell" (Main Version) – 3:39
2. "What the Hell" (Instrumental) – 3:39
- Japan CD single
1. "What the Hell" – 3:39
2. "Alice" (Extended Version) – 5:00
3. "What the Hell" (Instrumental) – 3:39

== Credits and personnel ==
- Songwriting – Avril Lavigne, Max Martin, Shellback
- Production and recording – Max Martin, Shellback
- Engineering – Michael Ilbert
- Mixing – Serban Ghenea
- Mix engineer – John Hanes
- Assistant mix engineer – Tim Roberts
- Lead vocals and background vocals – Avril Lavigne
- Drums, guitar and bass – Shellback
- Keyboards – Max Martin

Credits adapted from What the Hell CD single liner notes.

== Charts ==
=== Weekly charts ===
Weekly chart performance for "What the Hell"
Chart (2011)	Peak position
Australia (ARIA)	6
Austria (Ö3 Austria Top 40)	20
Belgium (Ultratop 50 Flanders)	16
Belgium (Ultratop 50 Wallonia)	13
Canada Hot 100 (Billboard)	8
Canada CHR/Top 40 (Billboard)	16
Canada Hot AC (Billboard)	8
Czech Republic Airplay (ČNS IFPI)	2
Euro Digital Songs (Billboard)	17
France (SNEP)	18
Germany (GfK)	21
Hungary (Rádiós Top 40)	5
Indonesia Radio Chart (ASIRI)	1
Ireland (IRMA)	30
Italy (FIMI)	15
Japan Billboard Hot 100	2
Japan Adult Contemporary Airplay (Billboard)	1
Japan (Oricon)	15
Mexico Anglo (Monitor Latino)	11
Netherlands (Dutch Top 40)	30
Netherlands (Single Top 100)	51
New Zealand (Recorded Music NZ)	5
Scottish Singles Sales (Official Charts)	14
Slovakia Airplay (ČNS IFPI)	8
South Korea (Gaon International Singles)	1
Sweden (Sverigetopplistan)	51
Switzerland (Schweizer Hitparade)	18
UK Singles (Official Charts)	16
US Billboard Hot 100	11
US Pop Airplay (Billboard)	8
US Adult Pop Airplay (Billboard)	12
Venezuela Pop Rock (Record Report)	19

=== Year-end charts ===
Annual chart rankings for "What the Hell"
Chart (2011)	Position
Australia (ARIA)	50
Belgium (Ultratop 50 Flanders)	94
Canada (Canadian Hot 100)	63
Hungary (Rádiós Top 40)	82
Italy (Musica e dischi)	79
Japan (Japan Hot 100)	10
Lebanon (The Official Lebanese Top 20)	57
South Korea (Gaon International Singles)	6
Taiwan (Hito Radio)	10
UK Singles (OCC)	142
US Billboard Hot 100	62
US Pop Airplay (Billboard)	42
US Adult Pop Songs (Billboard)	40

== Certifications and sales ==
Certifications and sales for "What the Hell"
Region	Certification	Certified units/sales
Australia (ARIA)	2× Platinum	140,000^{^}
Canada (Music Canada)	4× Platinum	320,000^{‡}
Denmark (IFPI Danmark)	Gold	45,000^{‡}
Italy (FIMI)	Gold	15,000^{*}
Japan (RIAJ) Digital single	2× Platinum	500,000^{*}
Mexico (AMPROFON)	Gold	30,000^{*}
New Zealand (RMNZ)	2× Platinum	60,000^{‡}
South Korea	—	798,673
United Kingdom (BPI)	Platinum	600,000^{‡}
United States (RIAA)	4× Platinum	4,000,000^{‡}
^{*} Sales figures based on certification alone.^{^} Shipments figures based on certification alone.^{‡} Sales+streaming figures based on certification alone.

== Release history ==
Street dates for "What the Hell"
Region	Date	Label	Format
France	10 January 2011	RCA Records	Digital download
Mexico	10 January 2011	RCA Records	Digital download
United States and Canada	11 January 2011	RCA Records	Digital download
United Kingdom	16 January 2011	RCA Records	Digital download
Japan	2 February 2011	Sony Music Japan	CD single
Germany	25 February 2011	RCA Records	CD single
