= Smile (Avril Lavigne song) =

2011 single by Avril Lavigne

Single by Avril Lavigne

from the album Goodbye Lullaby
- Released: April 11, 2011
- Recorded: 2010
- Studio: Maratone, Stockholm
- Genre: Pop-punk
- Length: 3:29
- Label: RCA
- Songwriters: Avril Lavigne; Max Martin; Shellback
- Producers: Max Martin; Shellback

Avril Lavigne singles chronology
"What the Hell" (2011)	"Smile" (2011)	"Wish You Were Here" (2011)

Music video
- "Smile" on YouTube

"Smile" is a song by Canadian recording artist Avril Lavigne from her fourth studio album Goodbye Lullaby (2011). It was co-written by Lavigne, Max Martin and Shellback and produced by Martin and Shellback. "Smile" was released on April 11, 2011 by RCA Records as the second single from the album to Australian radio stations and then on May 17 the song was released to US contemporary hit radio. Upon its release, the song received mixed reviews from music critics, who praised the track for catchiness but criticized its sound and lyrical content. It has charted at number three on the Brazilian chart and inside the top-thirty on the Australian, Japanese and New Zealand charts, in addition to being certified by the recording industry associations of Australia and the United States. A music video directed by Shane Drake was filmed in April 2011 and released on May. By November 2014, the music video had reached 100 million views on Vevo.

== Background ==
"Smile" was written by Lavigne along with its producers, Max Martin and Shellback. It was recorded at Maratone Studios in Stockholm, Sweden. "Smile" pays tribute to the special someone who was able to win her heart and put a grin on her face. Backed up by a punchy drum rhythm and electric guitars, Lavigne offers even more reasons why most normal guys would run in the other direction, then praises her guy for sticking around. Lavigne described the song as a "rocker", in which she "expresses her gratitude for special people in her life". Lavigne asked her fans via Twitter what the next single from Goodbye Lullaby should be, giving the choices between "Push" and "Smile". Lavigne confirmed that "Smile" was to be the second single from the album though reports suggest Lavigne was fighting for a "Push" release. The singer's record label, RCA Records, announced that "Smile" will be sent out to Polish radio in April, with the same expected to happen in other territories such as Canada, New Zealand, Asia, and the UK. She posted photos to her Twitter of the set of the music video, filmed on April 21, 2011.

Due to the many uses of profanity in the song, different clean edits have been released. The official clean edit which is played on most radio stations replaces "Crazy bitch" with "Crazy chick", removes "Shit", and replaces "You're fucking crazy" with "You like it crazy". Another edit is the same, but instead of removing "You don't really give a shit", it is replaced with "You don't really give it up." Finally, the iTunes edit completely blanks out all profanity, as well as "Blacked out". Some radio stations and music channels also remove "What did you put in my drink?"

== Composition ==
"Smile"
A 30 second sample of the chorus of Avril Lavigne's "Smile" from Goodbye Lullaby.

"Smile" is an up-tempo pop-punk song with heavy pop influences, with a frenzied drum beats, electric guitars and acoustic guitars. According to the sheet music published at Musicnotes.com by Alfred Publishing, the song is written in the key of F♯ minor and is set in time signature of common time with a tempo of 100 beats per minute. Lavigne's vocal range spans two octaves, from E_{3} to F♯_{5}. The lyrics of "Smile" carry a message of infatuation, with Lavigne paying tribute to the special someone who was able to win her heart and put a grin on her face.

== Critical reception ==
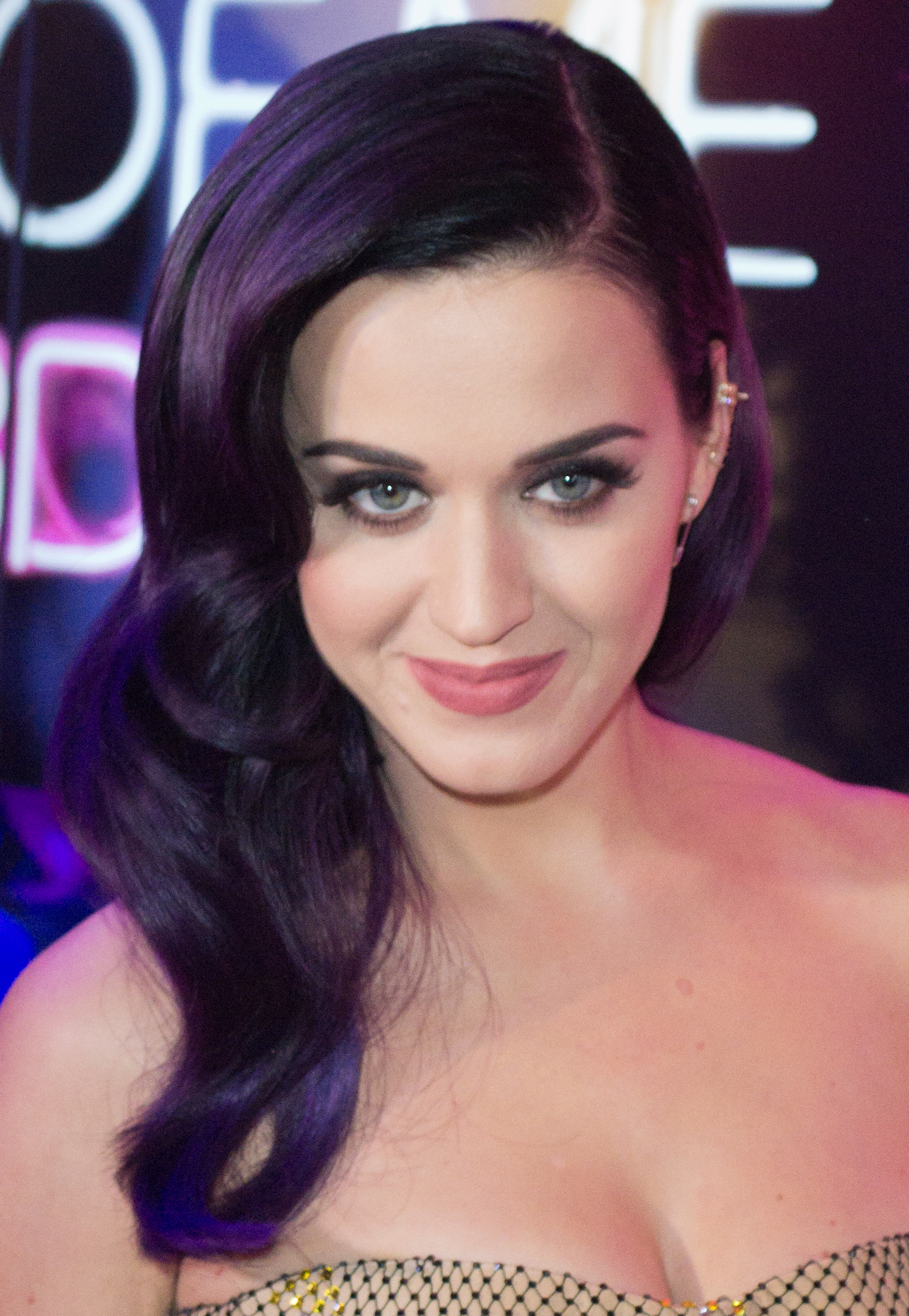
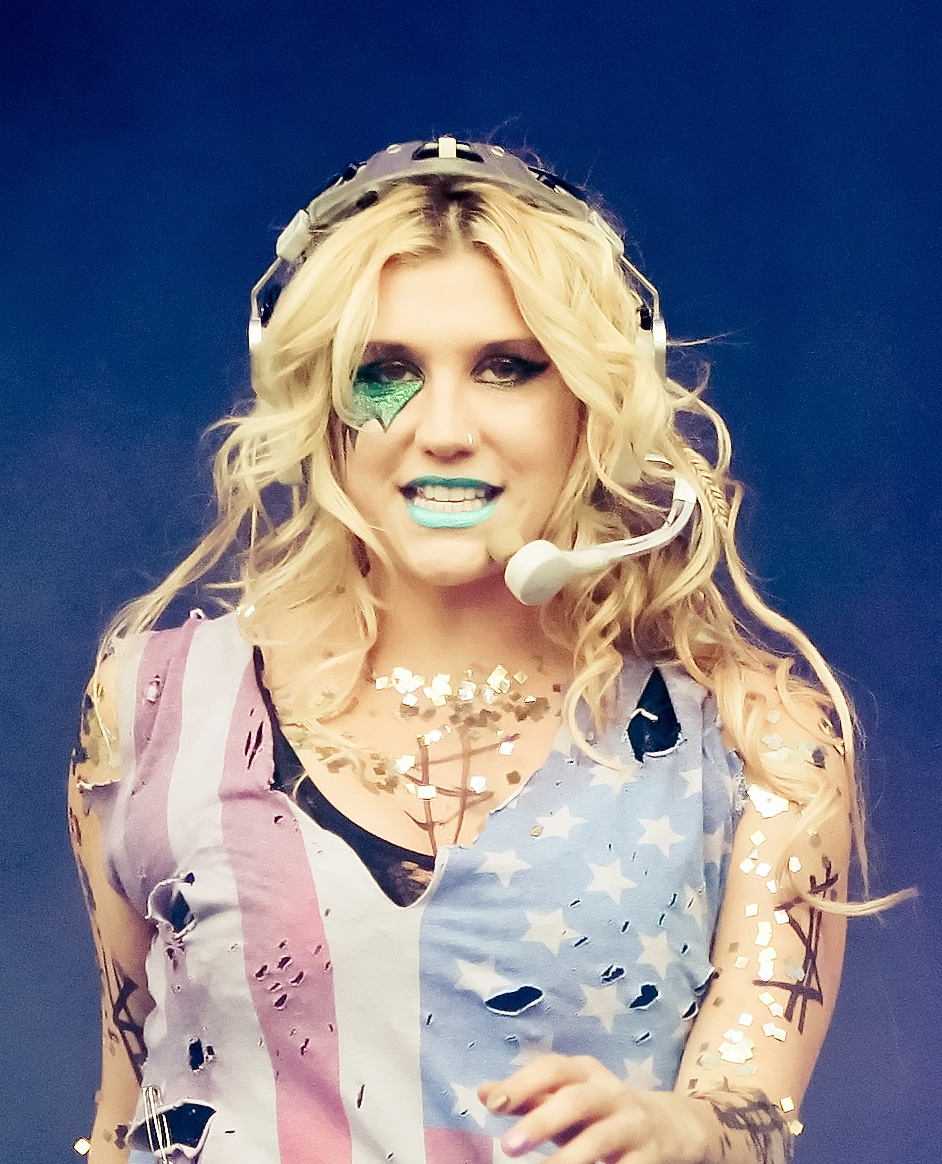
"Smile" was compared to songs by Katy Perry (left) and Kesha (right).

Jon Pareles of The New York Times praised the song, commenting that "[i]n 'Smile,' [Lavigne] slings four-letter words through a tale of rock craziness and love at first sight." Allison Stewart of The Washington Post criticized the song for being lackluster and emotionless. She commented: "[Lavigne's] heart isn't in it. Once a Hot Topic punk pioneer, she now sounds like a B-list Katy Perry who isn't having any fun." Andy Greenwald of Entertainment Weekly referred to the song as "sassy," commenting that "its talk of doctored drinks and blackout tattoos, restore Avril to her rightful place ahead of Katy Perry and Ke$ha." Marcus Gilmer of The A.V. Club praised the "spunk" exhibited on the song, describing "Smile" as "dropping a litany of curse words [with Lavigne] asserting her right to be 'a crazy bitch' who does 'what I want when I feel like it.'" Margaret Wappler of the Los Angeles Times praised the song, commenting that "Lavigne is at her best when she can balance the sugar and the spice." She described the song as "the little girl fantasizing in the quiet moments after a grown woman’s excesses."

According to Jonathan Keefe of Slant Magazine, "Lavigne refers to herself as a 'crazy bitch' on 'Smile,' trying to co-opt some of Ke$ha’s trashiness but never committing to it fully." Al Fox of BBC described the song as "spiky [and] unstable," commenting that it "shoehorns in more needless swear words than a week’s worth of late-night Hollyoaks." Sarah Rodman of The Boston Globe referred to the song as "slashing," in reference to its relation to the album's theme of "outward relationships." Dan Weiss of The Village Voice referred to the song as "the only other Lullaby tune where [Lavigne] fully savors her role as the estranged divorcee godmother of the Ke$haverse, and it over-whomps like it’s doped up on 250 cc’s of Federline." He added that "Taylor Swift might parody all that really hilariously the next time she hosts SNL." Josh Langhoff of PopMatters referred to the song as problematic, criticizing the song's "bold pro-roofie stance." At the 2012 MuchMusic Video Awards, "Smile" garnered Lavigne a nomination in the Best International Video by a Canadian category.

== Chart performance ==
In the United States, "Smile" debuted at number 94 on the Billboard Hot 100 chart for the issue dated July 23, 2011. The song peaked at number 68 for the issue dated August 20, 2011, spending a total of seven weeks on the chart. "Smile" was also a success on the Mainstream Top 40 chart, peaking at number 25 and spending 11 weeks on the chart. Almost two years after its release, "Smile" was certified gold by the Recording Industry Association of America (RIAA) for sales of 500,000 paid digital downloads. In 2024 it was certified platinum by RIAA.

After officially being released as a single, "Smile" debuted on the Australian Singles Chart and New Zealand Singles Chart. In Australia, it debuted at number forty-two on May 2, 2011 and has peaked at number 25. The song has sold over 100,000 units of digital copies in the Australia. In New Zealand, the song debuted at thirty-three on 25 April 2011 and peaked at number thirty. The song peaked at 189 on the UK Singles Chart after her Britain's Got Talent performance, then fell out of the chart the next week, making it her lowest charting single to date in the United Kingdom. It was never released on radio in the United Kingdom, Germany and some other European countries.

== Music video ==
=== Background ===
The music video was shot on April 21, 2011, and was directed by Shane Drake. Lavigne uploaded videos on her YouTube account of the set of the video. On May 16, she posted a video titled "Ready, Set, Smile!". The next day, she posted another video, titled "Smile & Style". On May 18, she posted the third video, titled "Graffiti Guitar", and the fourth video, "Avril Lavigne - "Smile" Behind the Scenes" was viewed more than 120,000 times in less than 24 hours. Lavigne premiered the music video on May 18, 2011 on her Vevo account.

=== Synopsis and reception ===
Lavigne performing "Smile" in a white room. The walls are plastered with posters and spray painted words.

The video begins with Lavigne in a white room. She shakes a can of spray paint, and sprays a smiling face on the camera. Lavigne decorates the walls around her with The Black Star Tour posters, the word 'SMILE' and smiley faces. She plugs a red electric guitar into an amplifier, and begins to sing the first verse. The scene changes to black-and-white New York City. Lavigne walks over to people looking upset or distressed, and takes a piece of a broken heart represented by pieces of red broken glass lying by them. When she takes the piece of pieces, they begin to smile. The video switches between those locations; Lavigne in the white room and in the city, the same theme recurring throughout the duration of the video.

"Avril's serving as an unseen muse in the brokenness of life, and she sees the broken scattered remnants of hearts around the city, displayed by glass, and removes those pieces from people's lives [...] causing them to feel as though there's hope again."

— Shane Drake (director), Smile (Behind the Scenes)

Jeff Lapointe from MTV News was positive and says that "Lavigne is back to her heavy mascara and punk-like teenage look on a studio set which she decorated herself with color spray bombs, posters and a few props." Lapointe also says that the video is "energetic and love struck." Jamie Peck from MTV Buzzworthly commented that Lavigne is "learning to deal with things in a more grown-up fashion." Robbie Daw from Idolator wrote that "she's a foul-mouthed pop tart with a heart of gold!." Daw perceived that "those couple-breaking-up-at-a-cafe references to Debbie Gibson's 1988 "Foolish Beat" video." A positive response came from Billboard's writer Jon Blistein, who says that "It's simple, sweet, and unlike 'What the Hell', wonderfully void of blatant product placement." The website Terra was mixed, saying that Lavigne is stuck in the year 2000 in the video and that "she is still trying to play dress-up like she did back when "Complicated" made her peak."

== Live performances ==
Lavigne performed the song, while promoting the album, on Walmart Soundcheck, on "2DayFM", and also on T4. Lavigne has performed the song on the German show Schlag den Raab on June 4, 2011. The song was also recorded on Lavigne's concert on the aol.com website, to the AOL Sessions, with no release date announced yet. Lavigne performed a medley of the song and her previous single "What the Hell" on the British show Britain's Got Talent on June 1, and at the America's Got Talent 6th session on July 13.

She then flew to Japan to perform the song at TV Asahi's weekly music program, Music Station, on February 3, 2012.

== Track listings and formats ==
- Digital download
1. "Smile" (radio edit) – 3:28
- CD single
1. "Smile" – 3:29
2. "What the Hell" (Bimbo Jones remix) – 4:10

== Credits and personnel ==
Credits and personnel are adapted from the "Smile" single liner notes.

- Avril Lavigne – writer, lead vocals
- Max Martin – writer, producer, recording, keyboards
- Shellback – writer, producer, recording, drums, guitar, bass
- Michael Ilbert – engineer
- Serban Ghenea – mixing
- John Hanes – mixing engineer
- Tim Roberts – assistant mixing engineer

== Charts ==
=== Weekly charts ===
Chart (2011)	Peak position
Australia (ARIA)	25
Austria (Ö3 Austria Top 40)	37
Belgium (Ultratip Bubbling Under Flanders)	2
Belgium (Ultratip Bubbling Under Wallonia)	4
Brazil (Billboard Brasil Hot 100)	3
Canada Hot 100 (Billboard)	59
Canada Hot AC (Billboard)	41
Czech Republic Airplay (ČNS IFPI)	23
Germany (GfK)	40
Japan Adult Contemporary Airplay (Billboard)	14
Japan Hot 100 (Billboard)	25
Lebanon (The Official Lebanese Top 20)	20
New Zealand (Recorded Music NZ)	30
Slovakia Airplay (ČNS IFPI)	19
South Korea International (Gaon)	11
UK Singles (OCC)	189
US Billboard Hot 100	68
US Pop Airplay (Billboard)	25

== Certifications ==
Certifications for "Smile"
Region	Certification	Certified units/sales
Australia (ARIA)	Platinum	70,000^{^}
United States (RIAA)	Platinum	1,000,000^{‡}
^{^} Shipments figures based on certification alone.^{‡} Sales+streaming figures based on certification alone.

== Release history ==
Release dates and formats for "Smile"
Region	Date	Format	Label	Ref.
Australia	11 April 2011	Radio airplay	Sony Music	
Italy	29 April 2011	Radio airplay	Sony Music	
Belgium	6 May 2011	Digital download	Sony Music	
Denmark	6 May 2011	Digital download	Sony Music	
Finland	6 May 2011	Digital download	Sony Music	
France	6 May 2011	Digital download	Sony Music	
Greece	6 May 2011	Digital download	Sony Music	
Ireland	6 May 2011	Digital download	Sony Music	
Italy	6 May 2011	Digital download	Sony Music	
Luxemburg	6 May 2011	Digital download	Sony Music	
Netherlands	6 May 2011	Digital download	Sony Music	
Norway	6 May 2011	Digital download	Sony Music	
Portugal	6 May 2011	Digital download	Sony Music	
Spain	6 May 2011	Digital download	Sony Music	
Sweden	6 May 2011	Digital download	Sony Music	
Switzerland	6 May 2011	Digital download	Sony Music	
United States	17 May 2011	Contemporary hit radio	RCA	
Germany	3 June 2011	CD	Sony Music	
United Kingdom	3 July 2011	Digital download	RCA	
