= Goodbye Lullaby =

2011 studio album by Avril Lavigne

- Standard artwork. Special Edition changes the colour of the leaves and flowers to blue.

Studio album by Avril Lavigne
- Released: March 2, 2011
- Recorded: November 2008 – October 2010
- Studios: Big Evil Corp. (Los Angeles, CA); Maratone Studios (Stockholm, Sweden); Mr. Biz Studio (Los Angeles, CA); Ruby Red Productions (Santa Monica, CA)
- Genres: Pop rock; pop
- Length: 47:12
- Label: RCA
- Producers: Avril Lavigne; Max Martin; Shellback; Butch Walker; Deryck Whibley

Avril Lavigne chronology
The Best Damn Thing (2007)	Goodbye Lullaby (2011)	Avril Lavigne (2013)

Singles from Goodbye Lullaby
- 1. "What the Hell" Released: January 10, 2011; 2. "Smile" Released: April 11, 2011; 3. "Wish You Were Here" Released: September 9, 2011; 4. "Push" Released: February 13, 2012

Goodbye Lullaby is the fourth studio album by Canadian singer-songwriter Avril Lavigne, released worldwide on March 2, 2011, through RCA Records. Recording sessions for the album began in November 2008 and continued over a period of nearly two years, concluding in October 2010. Goodbye Lullaby is primarily a pop rock and pop album, more introspective than Lavigne's previous material. It consists mainly of stripped down instruments such as the piano and acoustic guitar. Lavigne assumed an integral role in the album's production, co-writing every original, as well as collaborating with several producers including Max Martin, Shellback, Butch Walker, and her ex-husband Deryck Whibley. Goodbye Lullaby is Lavigne's third and final studio album with RCA, following The Best Damn Thing (2007) and Under My Skin (2004).

Upon its release, Goodbye Lullaby received generally mixed reviews from music critics, with some naming it her most personal and introspective album while others took issue with its subdued sound and Lavigne's lyrical content. The album debuted inside the top five in over 15 countries such as the United States and Canada (where it has since been certified gold) and topping the charts in over eight countries, such as Australia, Greece, Hong Kong and Japan.

Goodbye Lullaby has sold 1.5 million copies worldwide as of 2013. Three singles were released from Goodbye Lullaby. "What the Hell" was released as the lead single in January 2011 and achieved worldwide chart success, reaching the top 20 in the United States and United Kingdom, the top ten in Europe and Australia and the top five in Asia. The following singles, "Smile" and "Wish You Were Here", had moderate chart success worldwide. The album also includes an extended version of the soundtrack single for Alice in Wonderland (2010), titled "Alice". Lavigne promoted the album with a series of live performances and later embarked on the Black Star Tour (2011).

== Background and release ==
"My record company was being a typical record company and trying to give me their version of how it should be – trying to get me to go in a different direction. I had to fight with them over and over. I was like, 'No, this is a really special record to me and this is what I'm doing'."

— Lavigne, Digital Spy

Lavigne's third studio album, The Best Damn Thing (2007), was a great commercial success, mainly due to its lead-single, "Girlfriend" (a number-one hit in over six countries) and its successful worldwide tour, the Best Damn World Tour (2008). In September 2009, it was reported that Lavigne and husband Deryck Whibley were separating. The same day, MTV News reported that he was working with her on the follow-up album to The Best Damn Thing. They used their home studio to produce eight of the nine tracks she initially recorded for the album. "I think this is taking the spirit of what she's done on previous records so much further," he said. "It's way more meaningful, has more of an impact, more emotional. It makes me feel something more than the other stuff. And I wanted to match that musically with the track."

The album and lead single's release dates had been pushed back several times. The album was originally scheduled for release on November 17, 2009. Later, in January 2010, Lavigne stated that the album cover had been photographed and the first single would be released in April followed by the album in June. In May, Lavigne said that she considered the album too serious and "mellow" and would return to the studio to balance the album out, "With an album, I don't want to rush it out.... I have a very serious record, so I think I need to put a couple upbeat, fun songs on it." In August 2010, Lavigne returned to Henson Recording Studios with producer Alex da Kid. During these sessions, Lavigne had strep throat, and the people involved were required to wear surgical masks. Despite her doctor's warning, Lavigne recorded vocals, "I wasn't able to sing for the last forty-eight hours because I could do permanent damage to the vocal cords." She revealed that she had been "trying new stuff" and that she was "exploring". Lavigne added that she had enough material for two records.

In October 2010, Lavigne was featured in Maxim for the November issue. During the interview she revealed that she had finished Goodbye Lullaby after two and a half years. However, in November, Lavigne announced that her album had been completed for a year, citing her record company as the reason for the album's delays. Lavigne stated that her record company wanted something more upbeat to keep up with mainstream radio, "Radio's very rhythmic and urban and dance today. I think they wanted me to do something more like that, but that's not what my vision was for this album". The entire track listing for the album was revealed on December 21, 2010, after some were announced in early December.

== Recording ==
Lavigne began recording in her home studio in November 2008 with the song "Black Star", only a month after completing the Best Damn World Tour. To help promote her first fragrance, Black Star, Lavigne needed a short theme that would be used for the TV spots. "Black Star" was composed in a Malaysian hotel during her tour. The jingle was eventually expanded into a short introduction to the album. Recording began with minimal instruments, usually starting with Lavigne singing only to acoustic guitar, with additional instruments added later. Lavigne stated that her vocals were the most important instrument to her during the album's recording, "Typically the lead vocal gets buried in the track and you can't always hear the quality, character, or emotion after a certain point. I wanted my voice to be the main instrument."

Lavigne described the process: "It's stripped down. I love performing that way, so I really felt like it was time to make a record like that. To just make it all about the vocal and the performance, and the vibe, and the emotion." Because she has a studio in her home, Lavigne was able to compose and record at her leisure. She also used the piano to compose the majority of the songs. "The piano is more of an emotional instrument. It stirs up different emotions for me and moves me in a different way than the guitar can." By July 2009, nine tracks had been recorded, including the songs "Fine", "Everybody Hurts" and "Darlin'", the latter being the second song Lavigne wrote as a 15-year-old while living in Napanee, Ontario. Lavigne stated that this album would be different from her previous work, "The other albums I've done, the songs are all over the place. This is the most consistent album all the way through."

In addition to working with Deryck Whibley in the majority of the songs, Lavigne also produced two songs on her own and worked with Max Martin and Shellback. "What was really great about working with Max was, I flew out to Sweden for a couple weeks, sat down, played him my record, got to know each other, wrote some songs together, and then I was out," she told MTV News. "It switched it up for me. It was a new creative space, a new relationship, and we got a lot done. He's very talented." Lavigne's longtime collaborators Evan Taubenfield and Butch Walker co-wrote and produced some of the tracks as well. In November 2010, British producer Alex da Kid, who worked with Lavigne beginning in August 2010, stated that some songs on the album will have a hip-hop sound, "We've got some things that are hip-hop leaning, and we've got some things that are more pop/rock leaning". In December, it was announced that the songs produced by Alex da Kid would not be on the album but Lavigne stated, "we're gonna do something with that stuff, I'm just not sure what yet".

== Composition and themes ==
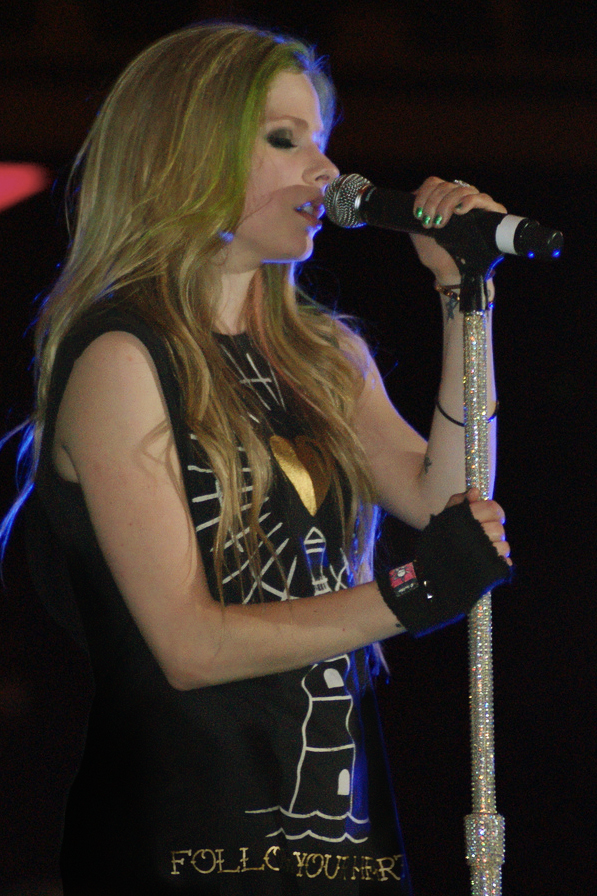
Lavigne during the Tampa Bay Rays post-game concert at Tropicana Field in St. Petersburg, Florida, May 2011.

"Goodbye Lullaby" deals with themes of heartbreak and was heavily influenced on Lavigne's relationship with her ex-husband Deryck Whibley. Lavigne described the album as being about how we all go through difficult experiences, whether it's ending a relationship, losing a job, or just missing someone. She stated, "It's so easy for me to do a boy-bashing pop song, but to sit down and write honestly about something that's really close to me, something I've been through, it's a totally different thing." The album serves as a return to Lavigne's older musical style and is largely acoustic. With the exception of the album's lead single, Lavigne describes the songs on the album as different from her earlier material, "I'm older now, so I think that comes across in my music, it's not as pop-rock and it's a little more mellow and it's deep". She said, "[For] this record, I just really, really wanted to sing.... I just wanna have silence around me, and have these acoustic songs and really deliver." For Adam R. Holz of Plugged In (publication), "these mellow acoustic songs paint a mournful, lamenting picture of a woman trying to sort through why her marriage failed."

The album opens with the intro "Black Star", which lasts for 1 minute and 34 seconds, and was described by Rolling Stone as "an ethereal lullaby that turns epic with tinkling Coldplay-like pianos and soaring strings." The second track and first single off the album, "What the Hell", was described by Lavigne herself as "a broad message about personal freedom", calling it her "most pop track on the record", the least personal song from the album and the song most reminiscent of her previous work. In "Push", she forcefully tells a guy to stop complaining about how hard it can be to make a relationship work, while the power ballad "Wish You Were Here" shows Lavigne's vulnerable side, and according to Spin's Mikael Wood, "talks about her recent divorce from Deryck Whibley". The other upbeat, pop rock track "Smile", finds Lavigne referring to herself as a "crazy bitch" and expressing her gratitude for special people in her life. The sixth track "Stop Standing There", written only by herself, has been described as having an "early- '50s girl-group feel", while lyrically it finds Lavigne imploring a hesitant suitor to confess his affection.

The seventh track "I Love You" fondly reminisces about how Avril loved getting drunk with her ex, among other things, while "Everybody Hurts" ponders why things turned out as they have and longs for a second chance. For Andy Greenwald of Entertainment Weekly, "Not Enough" is a raw confessional track, while "4 Real", written and produced by herself, concerns about authenticity in a lover, with Lavigne insisting that her partner be "4 real," because everything feels right. Acoustic guitar and piano, as well as an orchestra are used in "Darlin'", "Remember When" and "Goodbye". "Darlin'" was written when Lavigne was 14 years old. "Whenever I hear 'Darlin,' I think of the family room I wrote it in and playing it for my mom," she says. "So it's really special for me to have it on the album." "Remember When" realizes that the breaking of what's supposed to be an eternal bond has serious emotional consequences as it captures the ache of post-divorce loneliness. The final track "Goodbye" talks about finding the strength to close one chapter of her life and move on to the next. Lavigne stated that it was the most personal song she has ever wrote and was the inspiration for the album's title. The hidden track "Alice" was made for Tim Burton's film fantasy Alice in Wonderland, which was included on the compilation album Almost Alice. The album's version differs lyrically from the soundtrack's.

== Promotion ==
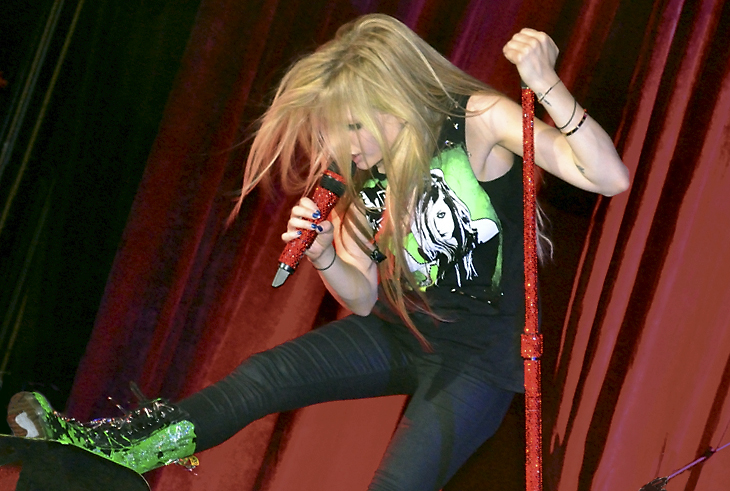
Lavigne during a performance in Belo Horizonte, August 2011

To promote the album, Lavigne went to a lot of TV shows, such as Today, on March 8, 2011, The View, on March 9, 2011. The singer also went to The Tonight Show with Jay Leno, on March 14, 2011, and Jimmy Kimmel Live, on March 15, 2011. In all TV shows, she performed the single "What the Hell". She also went to Chelsea Lately for an interview, on March 21, 2011. She also promoted the album in Australia, performing at the World Famous Rooftop. Lavigne also travelled to the United Kingdom to perform on the BBC'S Radio 1 Live Lounge, singing "What the Hell" and Kesha's "Tik Tok".

Furthermore, Lavigne embarked on her fourth worldwide concert tour, Black Star Tour, in April 2011, starting in Asia. Lavigne completed the tour in February 2012, bringing the Goodbye Lullaby album cycle to a close.

=== Singles ===
Lavigne premiered the lead single, "What the Hell", on Dick Clark's New Year's Rockin' Eve on December 31, 2010 during a pre-taped segment along with a performance of "Girlfriend". Lavigne said the song is "a really fun, upbeat party song, so it worked out really well to play it for the first time on New Year's Rockin' Eve." The following day, "What the Hell" was available as a free download for 48 hours from Lavigne's official Facebook page. The video for the single was released in January 2011. The song was a success in Australia, Canada and New Zealand, reaching the top-ten, while it reached the top-twenty in France, the United Kingdom and the United States.

Lavigne asked her fans via Twitter what the next single should be, giving the choices between "Push" and "Smile", with "Smile" ultimately being chosen as the second release. It was released worldwide on May 6, 2011 and its music video features scenes of Avril on a studio set which she decorated herself with color spray bombs, posters and a few props, while she goes around picking up the pieces of broken hearts in people who are otherwise unhappy. The song was a very moderate success on the charts, only reaching the top-forty in Australia, Austria, Germany and New Zealand. In the U.S., it only reached number 68.

Lavigne confirmed in July 2011 that "Wish You Were Here" would become the third and final single from Goodbye Lullaby, released on September 9, 2011. Previously charting in the US and Canada through downloads alone, when the album was released in March 2011, the song performed very modestly as a single, only reaching number 64 on the Canadian Hot 100 chart and number 65 on the Billboard Hot 100. The song's music video, directed by Marc Webb, features Avril very emotional in a room, looking sad, lighting flora on fire and dunking her head underwater in a bathtub.

"Push" was released on February 20, 2012, exclusively in Japan, reaching a peak of 35 on the Japan Hot 100.

=== Other songs ===
On March 1, 2012, Lavigne released an exclusive music video for the closing track of the album "Goodbye". The video was directed by Mark Liddell, and was released as a thank you towards her fans. It was filmed at the Chateau Marmont in Hollywood.

== Critical reception ==
Professional ratings
Aggregate scores
Source	Rating
Metacritic	58/100
Review scores
Source	Rating
About.com	3/5 stars
AllMusic	3/5 stars
The A.V. Club	(C−)
Digital Spy	4/5 stars
Entertainment Weekly	B-
The Globe and Mail	1.5/4 stars
PopMatters	(5/10)
Rolling Stone	3/5 stars
Slant Magazine	2.5/5 stars
Spin	(5/10)

Goodbye Lullaby received mixed reviews from music critics, based on aggregate score of 58 from Metacritic. Stephen Thomas Erlewine of AllMusic compared Goodbye Lullaby to Under My Skin, citing the divorce from Deryck Whibley as "the occasion for introspection". However, he noticed that Lavigne "seems to be grappling with emotions just beyond her reach, never articulating her angst or crafting a melancholy melody, making Goodbye Lullaby feel affected, not genuine." Likewise, Andy Greenwald of Entertainment Weekly thought that the album "seeks a balance," since "the first half is loaded with glossy confections, while the second consists of quieter reflections clearly inspired by Deryck Whibley, her ex-husband." Giving a grade of B−, Greenwald found out that the singer "seems to be desperate to share her artistic interior, which is far from fully formed." Bill Lamb from About.com echoed the same thought, writing that the album is "very downbeat and subdued," praising the two songs produced by herself, but ultimately calling it "a bit like a wasted moment in time." Jonathan Keefe of Slant Magazine gave the album 2.5 out of 5 stars, calling it "a strident, ineffectual attempt at a serious pop record." Josh Langhoff of PopMatters found problems with its lyrics, pointing out that "she's an artist who benefits from collaboration." Writing for the Canadian newspaper The Globe and Mail Robert Everett-Green also criticized the lyrics, writing that, "The songs contain little to catch the ear of anyone who isn't already a fan. This is disposable, industrial pop, short on invention and buffed to a high gloss."

In contrast to the mixed reviews, Robert Copsey of Digital Spy gave the album 4 out of 5 stars, highlighting its production, calling it "a solid collection of tunes that neatly ties together the sounds of her last three records: the angst of 'Let Go', the raw emotion of 'Under My Skin' and the pop hooks of 'The Best Damn Thing'." Billboard Magazine was also favorable, naming the album "the songstress' most intimate and soul-baring set to date." Jon Pareles from The New York Times was also positive, expressing that "on Goodbye Lullaby, she's trying to be a little more expansive, vocally and emotionally, without leaving pop territory". Pareles positively pointed out that, "It's the pop-factory material, not Ms. Lavigne's own presumably more personal songs, that offers details, humor and a sense of letting go. Her grown-up seriousness could use a little more of them". Giving 3 stars out of 5, Jody Rosen of Rolling Stone was impressed that the album "is lovelorn and introspective, full of gusty tunes with a surprising message: Avril cares". Margaret Wappler of Los Angeles Times found issues "when Lavigne compartmentalizes her softer side, to the point where it eclipses her finger-jabbing cheekiness."

=== Accolades ===
Award	Year	Category	Result	Ref.
Japan Gold Disc Awards	2012	Best 3 Albums	Won	
Juno Award	2012	Album of the Year	Nominated	
Juno Award	2012	Pop Album of the Year	Nominated	

== Commercial performance ==
In the United States, Goodbye Lullaby debuted at number four on the US Billboard 200 chart, with first-week sales of over 87,000. It eventually became her first studio album to not peak inside the top two. In its second week, the album dropped to number seven on the chart selling over 32,000 copies. In its third week, the album dropped to number 24. The album spent a total of 26 weeks on the Billboard 200, and has sold 394,000 copies in the U.S., according to Nielsen SoundScan, as of September 2015. In 2018 it was certified gold by RIAA for selling 500,000 equivalent units. In Lavigne's native Canada, the album ended her streak of consecutive number-one albums, debuting at number two with sales of 13,000 copies. It was certified platinum in Canada denoting 80,000 units sold.

In the United Kingdom, where all of her three consecutive albums debuted at the top of the UK Albums Chart, Goodbye Lullaby only managed to debut at number nine with 22,000 units sold, remaining on the chart for only nine weeks; her longest was Let Go with 67 weeks. The album was eventually certified gold in the UK for sales of over 100,000 units. In neighboring Scotland and Ireland, the album peaked at numbers nine and 12 respectively, becoming Lavigne's first to miss the top two in the former and her first to miss the top spot in the latter. Elsewhere in Europe, the album reached the top five in each of Germany, Austria, and Switzerland, by peaking at numbers four, three, and two respectively. It also made the top five in both France and Italy by peaking at numbers four and five. In Portugal the album became her best album on the charts since Under My Skin by peaking at number five. In Spain, the album also performed well, debuting at number four and becoming her highest charting-album there.

In Australia, the album topped the ARIA Albums Chart, becoming her third non-consecutive number-one album and her first since Under My Skin, after three months the album was certified Gold in Australia ARIA reaching 35,000 copies. In New Zealand the album peaked at number seven, marking Lavigne's fourth consecutive top ten album. Goodbye Lullaby earned its greatest success in Japan, where it debuted at number two on the Japanese Oricon Albums Chart with sales of 130,000 copies in its opening week – the largest opening of the album in a particular country. This was particularly impressive since it was released during the 2011 Tohoku earthquake, which cut off all promo. During the first three months, the album sold over 250,000 copies in Japan, receiving Platinum certification. As of June 2011, the album had sold over 336,000 copies. In Japan the album had sold 410,000 copies as of November 2013. As of 2013, Goodbye Lullaby had sold 1.5 million copies worldwide.

== Track listing ==
No.	Title	Writer(s)	Producer(s)	Length
1.	"Black Star"	Avril Lavigne	Deryck Whibley	1:34
2.	"What the Hell"	Lavigne; Max Martin; Shellback	Max Martin; Shellback	3:40
3.	"Push"	Lavigne; Evan Taubenfeld	Whibley	3:01
4.	"Wish You Were Here"	Lavigne; Martin; Shellback	Martin; Shellback	3:45
5.	"Smile"	Lavigne; Martin; Shellback	Martin; Shellback	3:29
6.	"Stop Standing There"	Lavigne	Butch Walker	3:27
7.	"I Love You"	Lavigne; Martin; Shellback	Martin; Shellback	4:01
8.	"Everybody Hurts"	Lavigne; Taubenfeld	Whibley	3:41
9.	"Not Enough"	Lavigne; Taubenfeld	Whibley	4:18
10.	"4 Real"	Lavigne	Lavigne	3:28
11.	"Darlin"	Lavigne	Whibley	3:50
12.	"Remember When"	Lavigne	Whibley	3:29
13.	"Goodbye"	Lavigne	Lavigne	5:29
Total length:				47:12

Hidden track
No.	Title	Writer(s)	Producer(s)	Length
14.	"Alice" (extended version)	Lavigne	Walker	5:00

Japanese edition bonus tracks
No.	Title	Writer(s)	Producer(s)	Length
12.	"Alice" (extended version)	Lavigne	Walker	5:00
13.	"Remember When"	Lavigne	Whibley	3:29
14.	"Goodbye"	Lavigne	Lavigne	4:32
15.	"Knockin' on Heaven's Door"	Bob Dylan	Lavigne	2:52
Total length:				54:07

Deluxe edition bonus tracks
No.	Title	Writer(s)	Producer(s)	Length
1.	Untitled	Joan Jett
15.	"What the Hell" (acoustic)	Lavigne; Martin; Shellback	Shellback	3:40
16.	"Push" (acoustic)	Lavigne; Taubenfeld	Whibley	2:46
17.	"Wish You Were Here" (acoustic)	Lavigne; Martin; Shellback	Shellback	3:45
18.	"Bad Reputation"		Whibley	2:42
Total length:				64:08

Japanese deluxe edition bonus tracks
No.	Title	Writer(s)	Producer(s)	Length
18.	"Knockin' on Heaven's Door"	Dylan	Lavigne	2:52
19.	"Bad Reputation"	Jett	Whibley	2:42
Total length:				67:00

iTunes Store deluxe edition bonus content
No.	Title	Writer(s)	Length
19.	"What the Hell" (Bimbo Jones remix)	Lavigne; Martin; Shellback	4:09
20.	"The Making of Goodbye Lullaby" (video)		28:14
Total length:			96:41

Special edition bonus tracks
No.	Title	Writer(s)	Producer(s)	Length
20.	"What the Hell" (instrumental)	Lavigne; Martin; Shellback	Martin; Shellback	3:39
21.	"Wish You Were Here" (instrumental)	Lavigne; Martin; Shellback	Martin; Shellback	3:45
Total length:				75:51

Deluxe edition bonus DVD
No.	Title	Length
1.	"Introduction"
2.	"Avril Talks About the Making of Goodbye Lullaby"
3.	"Avril in the Studio"
4.	"Goodbye Lullaby... The Songs"
5.	"First Band Rehearsals for 'What the Hell'"
6.	"Acoustic Studio Session"
7.	"Album Cover Photo Shoot"

Special edition bonus DVD
No.	Title	Length
1.	"Making of Goodbye Lullaby"
2.	"What the Hell" (4Music live performance)
3.	"Smile" (4Music live performance)
4.	"Push" (4Music live performance)
5.	"Wish You Were Here" (4Music live performance)
6.	"Girlfriend" (4Music live performance)
7.	"What the Hell" (music video)
8.	"Smile" (music video)
9.	"Wish You Were Here" (music video)
10.	"What the Hell" (making of the video)
11.	"Smile" (making of the video)

Notes

- Song lengths, writing credits and producing credits taken from the Goodbye Lullaby liner notes and AllMusic.
- Co-writer and friend of Lavigne, Evan Taubenfeld provided the bridge vocals on "Push".

== Personnel ==
Credits for Goodbye Lullaby adapted from AllMusic.

- Keith Armstrong – mixing assistant
- David Campbell – string arrangements
- Dan Chase – digital engineer, editing, programming
- Josh Freese – drums
- Şerban Ghenea – mixing
- Erwin Gorostiza – design, layout
- John Hanes – engineer, mixing
- Rodney Howard – drums
- Michael Ilbert – engineer
- Ted Jensen – mastering
- Nik Karpen – mixing assistant
- Mark Liddell – photography
- Avril Lavigne – art direction, composer, guitar, piano, producer, vocals
- Chris Lord-Alge – mixing
- Max Martin – composer, engineer, keyboards, producer
- Maria Paula Marulanda – design, layout
- Tim Roberts – mixing assistant
- Andrew Schubert – mixing
- Steve Shebby – bass guitar
- Shellback – bass, composer, drums, engineer, guitar, producer
- Jake Sinclair – engineer
- Evan Taubenfeld – composer, digital editing, digital engineer, engineer, instrumentation, vocals
- Brad Townsend – mixing
- Butch Walker – engineer, instrumentation, producer
- Deryck Whibley – engineer, instrumentation, mixing, producer

== Charts ==
=== Weekly charts ===
Chart (2011)	Peak position
Australian Albums (ARIA)	1
Austrian Albums (Ö3 Austria)	3
Belgian Albums (Ultratop Flanders)	10
Belgian Albums (Ultratop Wallonia)	11
Canadian Albums (Billboard)	2
Czech Albums (ČNS IFPI)	1
Danish Albums (Hitlisten)	19
Dutch Albums (Album Top 100)	11
Finnish Albums (Suomen virallinen lista)	8
French Albums (SNEP)	4
German Albums (Offizielle Top 100)	4
Hungarian Albums (MAHASZ)	13
Irish Albums (IRMA)	12
Italian Albums (FIMI)	5
Japan Hot Albums (Billboard Japan)	1
Japanese Albums (Oricon)	2
Mexican Albums (Top 100 Mexico)	3
New Zealand Albums (RMNZ)	7
Norwegian Albums (VG-lista)	16
Polish Albums (ZPAV)	10
Portuguese Albums (AFP)	5
Russian Albums (2M)	5
Scottish Albums (Official Charts)	9
Slovenian Albums	4
South Korean Albums (Circle)	4
South Korean International Albums (Circle)	3
Spanish Albums (Promusicae)	10
Swedish Albums (Sverigetopplistan)	4
Swiss Albums (Schweizer Hitparade)	2
UK Albums (Official Charts)	9
US Billboard 200	4

=== Year-end charts ===
Chart (2011)	Position
Australian Albums (ARIA)	70
Hungarian Albums (MAHASZ)	84
Italian Albums (FIMI)	36
Japan Hot Albums (Billboard Japan)	20
Japanese Albums (Oricon)	13
Mexican Albums (AMPROFON)	70
Russian Albums (NFPF)	41
South Korean International Albums (Circle) Standard Edition	25
South Korean International Albums (Circle) Deluxe Edition	20
Swiss Albums (Schweizer Hitparade)	75
Taiwanese Albums (Western Albums of the Year)	2
US Billboard 200	115

== Certifications and sales ==
Region	Certification	Certified units/sales
Australia (ARIA)	Gold	35,000^{^}
Canada (Music Canada)	Platinum	80,000^{‡}
Italy (FIMI)	Gold	30,000^{*}
Japan (RIAJ)	Platinum	250,000^{^}
Mexico (AMPROFON)	Gold	30,000^{^}
New Zealand (RMNZ)	Gold	7,500^{‡}
Russia (NFPF)	Gold	5,000^{*}
South Korea	—	10.242 (Note: Standard + deluxe editions sales combined)
Taiwan (RIT)	5× Platinum	50,000^{*}
United Kingdom (BPI)	Gold	100,000^{‡}
United States (RIAA)	Gold	500,000^{‡}
Summaries
Worldwide	—	1,500,000
^{*} Sales figures based on certification alone.^{^} Shipments figures based on certification alone.^{‡} Sales+streaming figures based on certification alone.

== Release history ==
Date	Region	Label
March 2, 2011	Japan	Sony Music Japan
March 4, 2011	Australia	Sony Music
March 4, 2011	Germany	Sony Music
March 4, 2011	Ireland	Sony Music
March 4, 2011	Netherlands	Sony Music
March 4, 2011	Sweden	Sony Music
March 7, 2011	Brazil	Sony Music
March 7, 2011	Russia	Sony Music
March 7, 2011	United Kingdom	Columbia Records
March 8, 2011	Canada	RCA Records
March 8, 2011	Indonesia	Sony Music
March 8, 2011	Mexico	Sony Music
March 8, 2011	South Korea	Sony Music
March 8, 2011	Taiwan	Sony Music
March 8, 2011	United States	RCA Records
March 15, 2011	Philippines	Sony Music; Ivory Music and Video
March 15, 2011	Chile	Sony Music
