= Fallen (Tweak album) =

EP by Tweak
- Released: April 1, 2005
- Recorded: 2005
- Genre: Alternative rock, post-grunge

Tweak chronology
Tweak: A Greatest Hits Collection (2005)	Fallen (2005)	Crashcarburn EP (2006)

Fallen also known as Tweak EP is an EP by South African rock band, Tweak, now known as Crashcarburn.

A review for Punktastic reads: "After four previous releases and a string of big shows over in their homeland, you’d expect Fallen to be better than it is. But, for whatever reason, I just didn’t really enjoy this too much, rating it probably no better than average. Tweak play a slick brand of melodic punk rock, but without a distinctive vocalist or too many catchy choruses, the three tracks on offer here just kind of blend into one another."

== Track listing ==
1. Fuelling the Flame
2. Fallen
3. Catch The Wind
4. Last Mistake
5. Suffocate
6. Light the Way

== Personnel ==
- Garth Barnes - guitar, vocals
- Mike Stott - guitar, backing vocals
- Chris Brink - bass guitar, backing vocals
- Brendan Barnes - drums
