= Gravity (Crashcarburn album) =

Studio album by Crashcarburn
- Released: 2012
- Genre: Alternative rock
- Length: 46:52

Crashcarburn chronology
Long Live Tonight (2010)	Gravity (2012)

Gravity is the third album by Crashcarburn, released in 2012.

== Track listing ==
No.	Title	Length
1.	"The Light"	3:39
2.	"Light Up the Night"	3:17
3.	"Heartbeat Racing"	3:27
4.	"Aeroplane"	3:03
5.	"Gravity"	3:57
6.	"Higher Interlude"	1:51
7.	"The Ride"	2:55
8.	"Goodbye"	4:25
9.	"Wind Blows"	4:15
10.	"Get Up and Fly"	4:18
11.	"Battleships"	3:51
12.	"Monsters and Angels"	3:27
13.	"Silver Lining"	4:27
Total length:		46:52
