= Crash Car Burn =

Crashcarburn

EP by Crashcarburn
- Released: 2006
- Recorded: 2005
- Genre: Alternative rock, post-grunge

Crashcarburn chronology
Fallen (2005)	Crashcarburn (2006)	This City Needs a Hero (2007)

Crashcarburn EP is the debut EP by South African rock band, Crashcarburn.

== Track listing ==
1. "Broken Skyline"
2. "Heroes"
3. "Scarlet Letter"
4. "For Every Star"
5. "Sing This at my Wake"

== Personnel ==
- Garth Barnes – guitar, vocals
- Mike Stott – guitar, backing vocals
- Dylan Belton – guitar
- Chris Brink – bass guitar, backing vocals
- Brendan Barnes – drums
