= Crashcarburn =

Rock band from South Africa

CrashCarBurn
- Origin: Johannesburg, Gauteng, South Africa; London, England
- Genres: Power pop, pop punk, alternative rock
- Years active: 2006–present
- Members: Garth Barnes; Brendan "Bugsy" Barnes; Jaco Brittz; Etienne Janse Van Rensburg
- Past members: Ian Broekhuizen; Dylan Belton; Chris Brink
- Website: crashcarburn.com

CrashCarBurn is a rock band from South Africa. The band was formed in London in 2006 before returning to South Africa in early 2007.

The group's debut album, This City Needs a Hero was released in 2007 was recorded and produced in part at London's Miloco Studios by the Grammy nominated team of Colin Richardson and Matt Hyde.

In August 2007, 'Serenade', the first single from the album, reached 5FM's Hi5@5. Internationally the single 'Broken Skyline' enjoyed success on the UK market after being added to Kerrang Radio's play list as well as their annual 'Kerrang Unsigned' Compilation.

CrashCarBurn have completed four nationwide tours, including the "XBOX 360 Summer Tour" in 2007 and the "Powerzone Roadshow", "God Save the Clubs Tour" and the "Powerzone Summer Tour" in 2008. In 2008, they were chosen to play at the MyCokeFest festival in April, supporting Muse, Good Charlotte, 30 Seconds to Mars, Chris Cornell and Korn.

The band expanded internationally in 2008 winning the mtvU Freshmen competition for their "Serenade" music video as well as having significant play on MTV Africa. They also took part in the Vans Warped Tour 2008, performing sixteen dates across the east coast of America and two dates in Canada to crowds in excess of 14,000 people per show. They performed alongside international bands Angels and Airwaves, Paramore, Story of the Year, Reel Big Fish, Pennywise and Katy Perry amongst others.

In 2009 the band entered into the studio with producer Mark Trombino, to record their sophomore full-length record entitled 'Long Live Tonight'. The record was released in June 2010.

== Band members ==
Garth Barnes – vocals and rhythm guitar
Fabian Sing – lead guitar and backing vocals
Etienne Van Rensburg – bass
Brendan "Bugsy" Barnes – drums

== Discography ==
Date	Title
2006	Crashcarburn EP
2007	This City Needs a Hero
2010	Long Live Tonight
2012	Gravity
2013	Kings of Summer Single
2014	Rock n Roll Reverie EP
2014	Keep Walking EP
2015	Pay Back the Money EP
2015	Anthem of Warriors EP
2017	Juliet EP
2018	Headlights
2022	Back From the Dead
