= Long Live Tonight =

Studio album by Crashcarburn
- Released: 2010
- Recorded: 2010
- Genre: Alternative rock
- Length: 54.26
- Label: Independent

Crashcarburn chronology
| This City Needs a Hero (2007) | Long Live Tonight (2010) | Gravity (2012) |

Long Live Tonight is the second album from Crashcarburn, released in 2010. With the most popular songs in South Africa being "Twisted", "Long Live Tonight" and "Skin Versus Bone" on radio and South African charts. Long Live Tonight earned the band two SAMA nominations. This is the band's second album after first major album This City Needs a Hero.

== Track listing ==
All lyrics are written by Garth Barnes, Chris Brink and Mike Stott; all music is composed by Crashcarburn

| No. | Title | Length |
|---|---|---|
| 1. | "Long Live Tonight" | 2:53 |
| 2. | "More Than This" | 3:52 |
| 3. | "Die Beautiful" | 3:10 |
| 4. | "Twisted" | 4:04 |
| 5. | "Don't Wait" | 4:07 |
| 6. | "Skin Versus Bone" | 3:02 |
| 7. | "Piano Interlude" | 2:44 |
| 8. | "So Long September" | 4:27 |
| 9. | "Winter" | 3:32 |
| 10. | "A Quiet Place To Hide" | 3:39 |
| 11. | "London Killing" | 4:09 |
| 12. | "Somerset West" | 3:26 |
| 13. | "Silhouette On A Mountain" | 3:36 |
| 14. | "Green Eyes Blue Skies" | 8:21 |
| Total length: | | 55:26 |

== Personnel ==
- Garth Barnes - Guitar, vocals
- Dylan Belton - Guitar
- Brendan Barnes - drums
- Chris Brink - Bass guitar, backing vocals
- Mike Stott - Guitar, backing vocals
