= MuchMusic Video Award for Best International Video by a Canadian =

Music award category

This is a list of the MuchMusic Video Awards winners for Best International Video By A Canadian. Avril Lavigne holds the record for the most wins with four awards. Alanis Morissette follows her with two wins.

| Year | Artist | Video | Ref(s). |
|---|---|---|---|
| 1993 | Neil Young | "Unknown Legend" | |
| 1994 | Bryan Adams, Rod Stewart & Sting | "All For Love" | |
| 1995 | Alanis Morissette | "You Oughta Know" | |
| 1996 | Alanis Morissette | "Ironic" | |
| 2003 | Avril Lavigne | "Sk8er Boi" | |
| 2004 | Avril Lavigne | "Don't Tell Me" | |
| 2007 | Avril Lavigne | "Girlfriend" | |
| 2009 | Billy Talent | "Rusted from the Rain" | |
| 2010 | Justin Bieber f. Ludacris | "Baby" | |
| 2011 | Drake | "Find Your Love" | |
| 2012 | Justin Bieber f. Usher | "Somebody to Love (Remix)" | |
| 2013 | Avril Lavigne | "Here's To Never Growing Up" | |
