= Avril Lavigne =

Canadian singer (born 1984)

Avril Lavigne CM
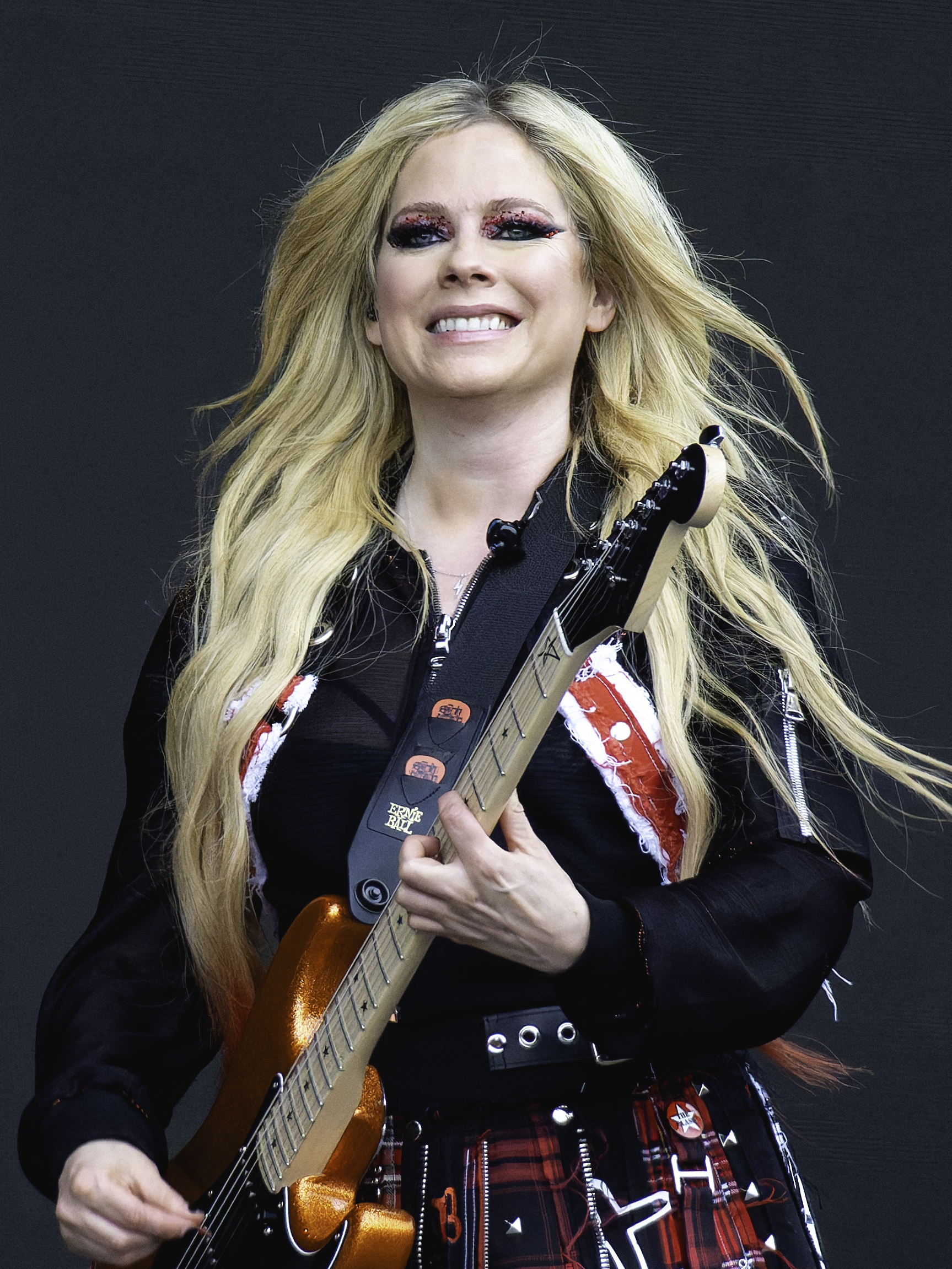
- Lavigne in 2024
- Born: Avril Ramona Lavigne; September 27, 1984 (age 42); Belleville, Ontario, Canada
- Citizenship: Canada; France
- Occupations: Singer; songwriter
- Years active: 1999–present
- Works: Discography; songs recorded; concert tours; promotional tours
- Spouses: Deryck Whibley (m. 2006; div. 2010) Chad Kroeger (m. 2013; div. 2015)
- Children: 1
- Awards: Full list
- Musical career
- Genres: Pop; pop-punk; pop rock; alternative rock
- Instruments: Vocals; guitar; piano
- Labels: Arista; RCA; Epic; BMG; Avril Lavigne Music; DTA; Elektra; Big Noise
- Website: avrillavigne.com

Avril Ramona Lavigne (Note: /ˈævrɪl ləˈviːn/ AV-ril lə-VEEN; French: [avʁil ʁamɔna laviɲ]) (born September 27, 1984) is a Canadian singer and songwriter. She is credited with boosting the popularity of pop-punk music, in particular for female-driven, punk-influenced pop music in the early 2000s. Her accolades include 10 Juno Awards and eight Grammy Awards nominations.

At age 16, Lavigne signed a two-album recording contract with Arista Records. Her debut album, Let Go (2002), is the best-selling album of the 21st century by a Canadian artist. It yielded the successful singles "Complicated" and "Sk8er Boi", which emphasised a skate punk persona and earned her the titles of "Pop-Punk Queen", "Pop-Punk Princess" and "Teen-Pop Slayer" from music publications. Her second album, Under My Skin (2004), became Lavigne's first to reach the top of the Billboard 200 chart in the United States, going on to sell 10 million copies worldwide.

Lavigne's third album, The Best Damn Thing (2007), reached number one in twelve countries worldwide and saw the international success of its lead single "Girlfriend", which became her first single to reach the top of the Billboard Hot 100 in the United States. Her next two albums, Goodbye Lullaby (2011) and Avril Lavigne (2013), saw continued commercial success and were both certified gold in Canada, the United States, and other territories. After releasing her sixth album, Head Above Water (2019), she returned to her pop-punk roots with her seventh album, Love Sux (2022).

== Early life ==
Avril Ramona Lavigne was born on September 27, 1984, in Belleville, Ontario. She was named Avril (the French word for April) by her father. Lavigne's paternal grandfather Maurice Yves Lavigne was born in Saint-Jérôme, Quebec. A member of the Royal Canadian Air Force, he married Lucie Dzierzbicki, a French native of Morhange in 1953. Their son, Jean-Claude Lavigne, was born in 1954 at RCAF Station Grostenquin near Grostenquin, Lorraine. When Jean-Claude was a child, the family moved to Ontario, and in 1975, he married Judith-Rosanne "Judy" Loshaw.

She was raised in the evangelical Christian faith. Lavigne's parents recognised her vocal abilities when she was two years old and sang "Jesus Loves Me" on the way home from their church. Lavigne has an older brother named Matthew and a younger sister named Michelle, both of whom teased her when she sang. "My brother used to knock on the wall because I used to sing myself to sleep and he thought it was really annoying."

When Lavigne was five, the family moved to Napanee (now incorporated as Greater Napanee), a town with a population of approximately 5,000 at the time. To support her musical interests, her father bought her a microphone, a drum kit, a keyboard, and several guitars, and converted their basement into a studio. Her father often played bass at the church the family attended, the Third Day Worship Centre in Kingston. When Lavigne was 14 years old, her parents took her to karaoke sessions. Lavigne performed at country fairs, singing songs by Garth Brooks, the Chicks, and Shania Twain, and began writing her own songs. Her first song was called "Can't Stop Thinking About You", about a teenage infatuation, which she described as "cheesy cute".

Lavigne played ice hockey from an early age. At age 10, she played in a boys' league in Napanee, where she was twice named most valuable player (MVP) as a right winger. In high school, she played on the girls' ice hockey and baseball teams, winning a trophy for her baseball pitching.

== Career ==
=== 1999–2001: Career beginnings ===
In 1999, Lavigne won a radio contest to perform with Canadian singer Shania Twain at the Corel Centre in Ottawa, before an audience of 20,000 people. Twain and Lavigne sang Twain's song, "What Made You Say That", and Lavigne told Twain that she aspired to be "a famous singer". During a performance with the Lennox Community Theatre, Lavigne was spotted by local folksinger Stephen Medd. He invited her to contribute vocals on his song, "Touch the Sky", for his 1999 album, Quinte Spirit. She later sang on "Temple of Life" and "Two Rivers" for his follow-up album, My Window to You, in 2000.

In December 1999, Lavigne was discovered by her first professional manager, Cliff Fabri, while singing country covers at a Chapters bookstore in Kingston. Fabri sent out VHS tapes of Lavigne's home performances to several industry prospects, and Lavigne was visited by several executives. Mark Jowett, co-founder of a Canadian management firm, Nettwerk, received a copy of Lavigne's karaoke performances recorded in her parents' basement. Jowett arranged for Lavigne to work with producer Peter Zizzo during the summer of 2000 in New York, where she wrote the song "Why". Lavigne was noticed by Arista Records during a trip to New York.

In November 2000, Ken Krongard, an A&R representative, invited Antonio "L.A." Reid, then head of Arista Records, to Zizzo's Manhattan studio to hear Lavigne sing. Her 15-minute audition "so impressed" Reid that he immediately signed her to Arista with a deal worth $1.25 million for two albums and an extra $900,000 for a publishing advance. By this time, Lavigne had found that she fit in naturally with her hometown high school's skater clique, an image that carried through to her first album, but although she enjoyed skateboarding, school left her feeling insecure. Having signed a record deal, and with support from her parents, she left school to focus on her music career. Lavigne's band, which were mostly the members of Closet Monster, was chosen by Nettwerk, as they wanted young performers who were up and coming from the Canadian punk rock scene who would fit with Lavigne's personality.

=== 2002–2003: Let Go ===
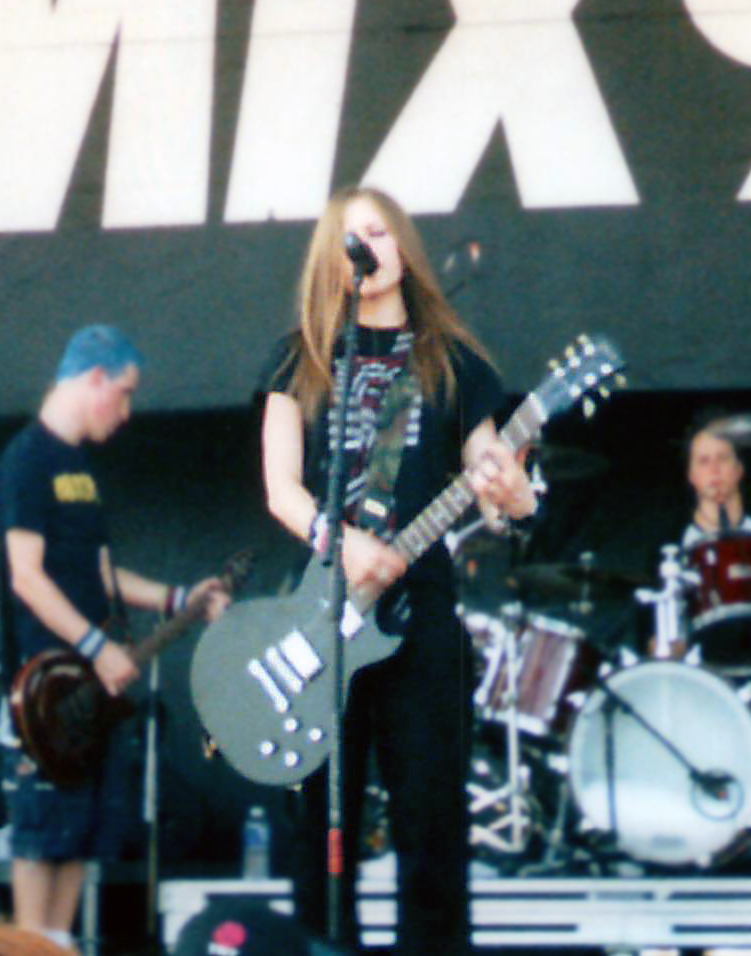
Lavigne performing in 2002

Reid gave A&R Joshua Sarubin the responsibility of overseeing Lavigne's development and the recording of her debut album. They spent several months in New York working with different co-writers, trying to forge an individual sound for her. Sarubin told HitQuarters that they initially struggled; although early collaborations with songwriter-producers including Sabelle Breer, Curt Frasca and Peter Zizzo resulted in some good songs, they did not match her or her voice. It was only when Lavigne went to Los Angeles in May 2001 and created two songs with the Matrix production team—including "Complicated", later released as her debut single—that the record company felt she had made a major breakthrough. Lavigne worked further with the Matrix and also with singer-songwriter Clif Magness. Recording of Lavigne's debut album, Let Go, finished in January 2002.

Lavigne released Let Go in June 2002 in the US, where it reached number two on the Billboard 200 albums chart. It peaked at number one in Australia, Canada, and the UK—this made Lavigne, at 17 years old, the youngest female soloist to have a number-one album on the UK Albums Chart at that time. By the end of 2002, the album was certified four-times Platinum by the RIAA, making her the bestselling female artist of 2002 and Let Go the top-selling debut of the year. By May 2003, Let Go had accumulated over 1 million sales in Canada, receiving a diamond certification from the Canadian Recording Industry Association. By 2009, the album had sold over 16 million units worldwide. By March 2018, the RIAA certified the album seven-times Platinum, denoting shipments of over seven million units in the US.

Lavigne's debut single, "Complicated", peaked at number one in Australia and number two in the US. "Complicated" was one of the bestselling Canadian singles of 2002, and one of the decade's biggest hits in the US, where subsequent singles "Sk8er Boi" and "I'm with You" reached the top ten. With these three singles, Lavigne became the second artist in history to have three top-ten songs from a debut album on Billboard's Mainstream Top 40 chart. Lavigne was named Best New Artist (for "Complicated") at the 2002 MTV Video Music Awards, won four Juno Awards in 2003 out of six nominations, received a World Music Award for "World's Bestselling Canadian Singer", and was nominated for eight Grammy Awards, including Best New Artist and Song of the Year for "Complicated".

In 2002, Lavigne made a cameo appearance in the music video for "Hundred Million" by the pop punk band Treble Charger. In March 2003, Lavigne posed for the cover of Rolling Stone magazine, and in May she performed "Fuel" during MTV's Icon tribute to Metallica. During her first headlining tour, the Try to Shut Me Up Tour, Lavigne covered Green Day's "Basket Case".

=== 2004–2005: Under My Skin ===
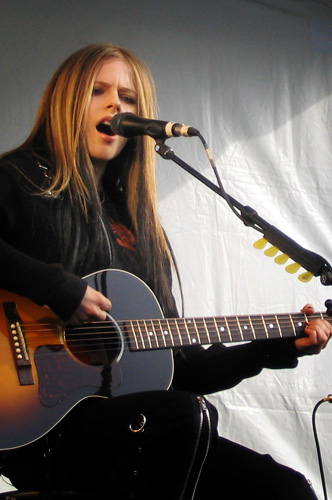
Lavigne in Burnaby during her promotional tour for Under My Skin in 2004

Lavigne's second studio album, Under My Skin, was released in May 2004 and debuted at number one in Australia, Canada, Japan, the UK, and the US. The album was certified five-times Platinum in Canada and has sold 10 million copies, including 3.2 million in the US. Lavigne wrote most of the album's tracks with Canadian singer-songwriter Chantal Kreviazuk, and Kreviazuk's husband, Our Lady Peace front man Raine Maida, co-produced the album with Butch Walker and Don Gilmore. Lavigne said that Under My Skin proved her credentials as a songwriter, saying that "each song comes from a personal experience of mine, and there are so much [sic] emotions in those songs". "Don't Tell Me", the lead single off the album, reached the top five in the UK and Canada and the top ten in Australia. "My Happy Ending", the album's second single, was a top five hit in the UK and Australia. In the US, it was a top ten entry on the Billboard Hot 100 and became a number-one pop radio hit. The third single, "Nobody's Home", did not manage to make the top 40 in the US and performed moderately elsewhere.

During early 2004, Lavigne embarked on the 'Live and By Surprise' acoustic mall tour in the US and Canada to promote Under My Skin, accompanied by her guitarist Evan Taubenfeld. In September 2004, Lavigne embarked on her first world tour, the year-long Bonez Tour. Lavigne won two World Music Awards in 2004, for 'World's Best Pop/Rock Artist' and 'World's Bestselling Canadian Artist' and won three Juno Awards from five nominations in 2005, including 'Artist of the Year'. She also won in the category of 'Favorite Female Singer' at the eighteenth annual Nickelodeon Kids' Choice Awards.

Lavigne co-wrote the song "Breakaway", which was recorded by Kelly Clarkson for the soundtrack to the 2004 film The Princess Diaries 2: Royal Engagement. "Breakaway" was released as a single in mid 2004 and subsequently included as the title track on Clarkson's second album, Breakaway. Lavigne performed the Goo Goo Dolls song "Iris" with the band's lead singer John Rzeznik at Fashion Rocks in September 2004, and she posed for the cover of Maxim in October 2004. She recorded the theme song for The SpongeBob SquarePants Movie (released in November 2004) with producer Butch Walker.

=== 2006–2011: The Best Damn Thing and Goodbye Lullaby ===
In February 2006, Lavigne represented Canada at the closing ceremony of the 2006 Winter Olympics. Fox Entertainment Group approached Lavigne to write a song for the soundtrack to the 2006 fantasy-adventure film Eragon; her contribution, "Keep Holding On", was released as a single to promote the film and its soundtrack.

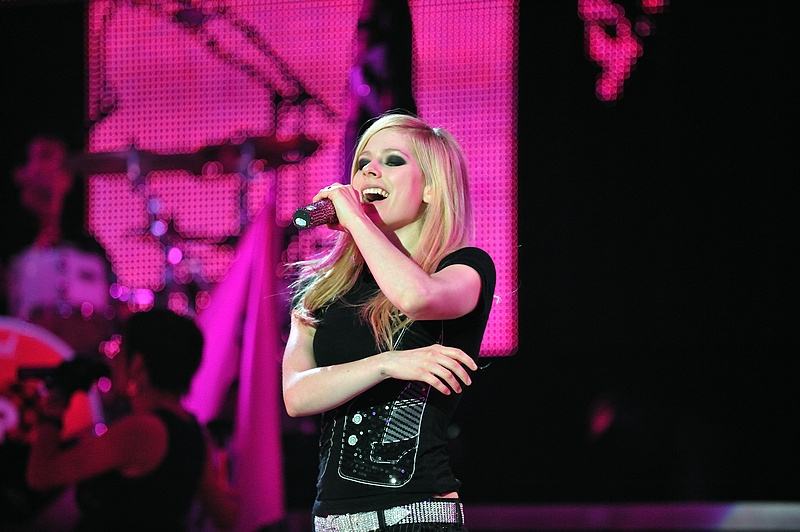
Lavigne performing during The Best Damn World Tour in 2008

Lavigne's third album, The Best Damn Thing, was released in April 2007 and debuted at number one on the US Billboard 200, and subsequently achieved Platinum status in Canada. The album sold more than 2 million copies in the US. Its lead single, "Girlfriend", became Lavigne's first number-one single on the US Billboard Hot 100 and one of the decade's biggest singles. The single also peaked at number one in Australia, Canada, and Japan, and reached number two in the UK and France. As well as English, "Girlfriend" was recorded in Spanish, French, Italian, Portuguese, German, Japanese, and Mandarin. The International Federation of the Phonographic Industry ranked "Girlfriend" as the most-downloaded track worldwide in 2007, selling 7.3 million copies, including the versions recorded in eight different languages. "When You're Gone", the album's second single, reached the top five in Australia and the United Kingdom, the top ten in Canada, and the top forty in the US. "Hot" was the third single and charted only at number 95 in the US, although it reached the top 10 in Canada and the top 20 in Australia.

Lavigne won two World Music Awards in 2007, for 'World's Bestselling Canadian Artist' and 'World's Best Pop/Rock Female Artist'. She won her first two MTV Europe Music Awards, received a Teen Choice Award for 'Best Summer Single', and was nominated for five Juno Awards. In December 2007, Lavigne was ranked number eight in Forbes magazine's list of 'Top 20 Earners Under 25', with annual earnings of $12 million. In March 2008, Lavigne undertook a world tour, The Best Damn World Tour, and appeared on the cover of Maxim for the second time. In mid-August, Malaysia's Islamic opposition party, the Pan-Malaysian Islamic Party, attempted to ban Lavigne's tour show in Kuala Lumpur, judging her stage moves "too sexy". It was thought that her concert on August 29 would promote wrong values ahead of Malaysia's Independence Day on August 31. On August 21, 2008, MTV reported that the concert had been approved by the Malaysian government.

In January 2010, Lavigne worked with Disney to create clothing designs inspired by Tim Burton's feature film Alice in Wonderland. She recorded a song for its soundtrack, "Alice", which was played over the end credits and included on the soundtrack album Almost Alice. In February, Lavigne performed at the Vancouver 2010 Winter Olympics closing ceremony. Lavigne's song "I'm with You" was sampled by Rihanna on the track "Cheers (Drink to That)", which is featured on Rihanna's fifth album, Loud (2010). "Cheers (Drink to That)" was released as a single the following year, and Lavigne appeared in its music video. In December 2010, American singer Miranda Cosgrove released "Dancing Crazy", a song written by Lavigne, Max Martin and Shellback. It was also produced by Martin.

Lavigne began recording for her fourth album, Goodbye Lullaby, in her home studio in November 2008. Its opening track, "Black Star", was written to help promote her first fragrance of the same name. Lavigne described the album as being about her life experiences rather than focusing on relationships, and its style as less pop rock than her previous material, reflecting her age. The release date for Goodbye Lullaby was delayed several times, which Lavigne said was because of her label. Goodbye Lullaby was released in March 2011, and its lead single, "What the Hell", premiered in December 2010, ahead of the album's release. Goodbye Lullaby received Juno Award nominations for Album of the Year and Pop Album of the Year. By March 2018, Goodbye Lullaby sold more than 500,000 copies in the US, and it was certified Gold by the RIAA.

=== 2012–2017: Self-titled album ===
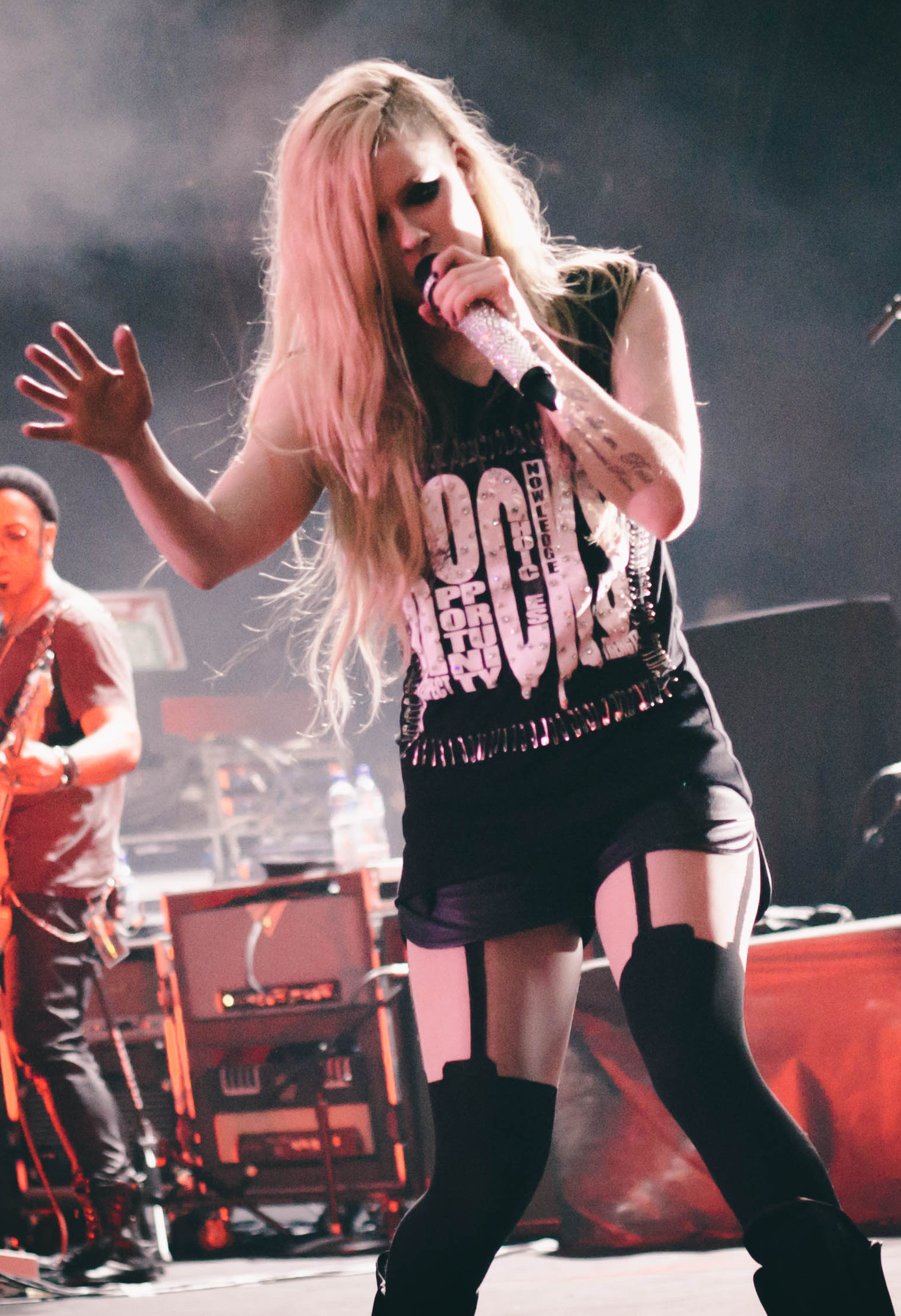
Lavigne performing in 2014

Three months after the release of Goodbye Lullaby, Lavigne announced that work on her fifth album had already begun, describing it as the musical opposite of Goodbye Lullaby and "pop and more fun again". In late 2011, she confirmed that she had moved to Epic Records, headed by L. A. Reid. Lavigne contributed two cover songs to the 2012 Japanese animated film One Piece Film: Z: "How You Remind Me" (originally by Nickelback) and "Bad Reputation" (originally by Joan Jett).

The lead single from Lavigne's fifth album, "Here's to Never Growing Up" (produced by Martin Johnson of the band Boys Like Girls), was released in April 2013 and reached top 20 positions on the Billboard Hot 100, Australia and the UK. The second single, "Rock n Roll", was released in August 2013 and the third, "Let Me Go" (featuring Lavigne's then-husband Chad Kroeger of Nickelback), was released in October 2013. The album, titled Avril Lavigne, was released in November 2013; in Canada, it was certified gold and received a Juno Award nomination for Pop Album of the Year. The fourth single from Avril Lavigne, "Hello Kitty", was released in April 2014. The music video sparked controversies over racism claims which Lavigne denied.

During mid-2014, Lavigne opened for boy band the Backstreet Boys' In a World Like This Tour and played at the Summer Sonic Festival in Tokyo. She released a music video for "Give You What You Like", the fifth single from her self-titled album on February 10, 2015. The song is featured in Lifetime's made-for-TV movie, Babysitter's Black Book. By March 2018, the album sold more than 500,000 copies in the US, and it was certified Gold by the RIAA.

In an April 2015 interview with Billboard, Lavigne announced a new single titled "Fly", which was released on April 26 in association with the 2015 Special Olympics World Summer Games.

Lavigne was featured in the song "Listen" from Japanese rock band One Ok Rock's eighth album, Ambitions, released on January 11, 2017. She was also featured in the song "Wings Clipped" by Grey with Anthony Green for the duo's debut extended play Chameleon, released on September 29, 2017.

=== 2019–2020: Head Above Water ===
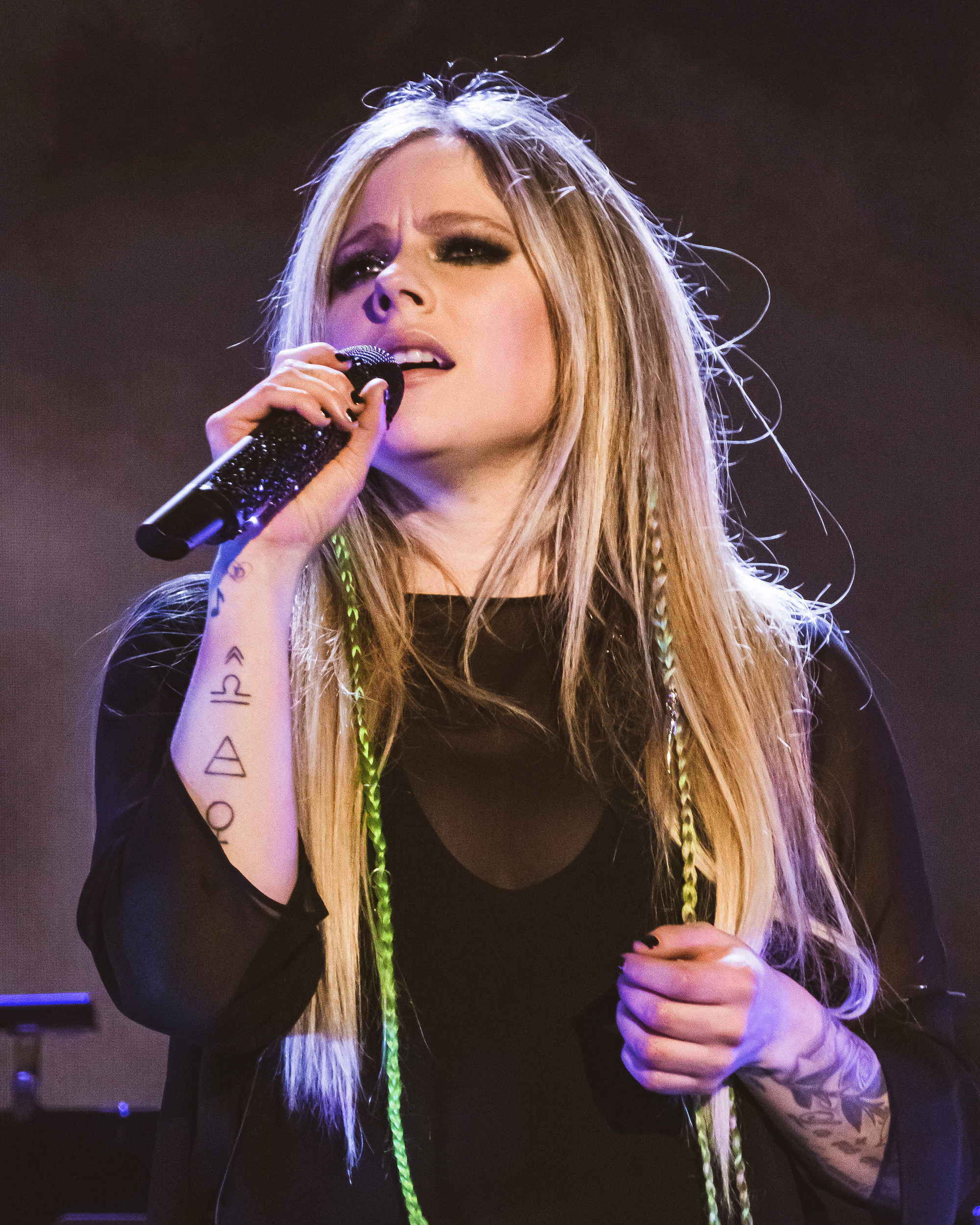
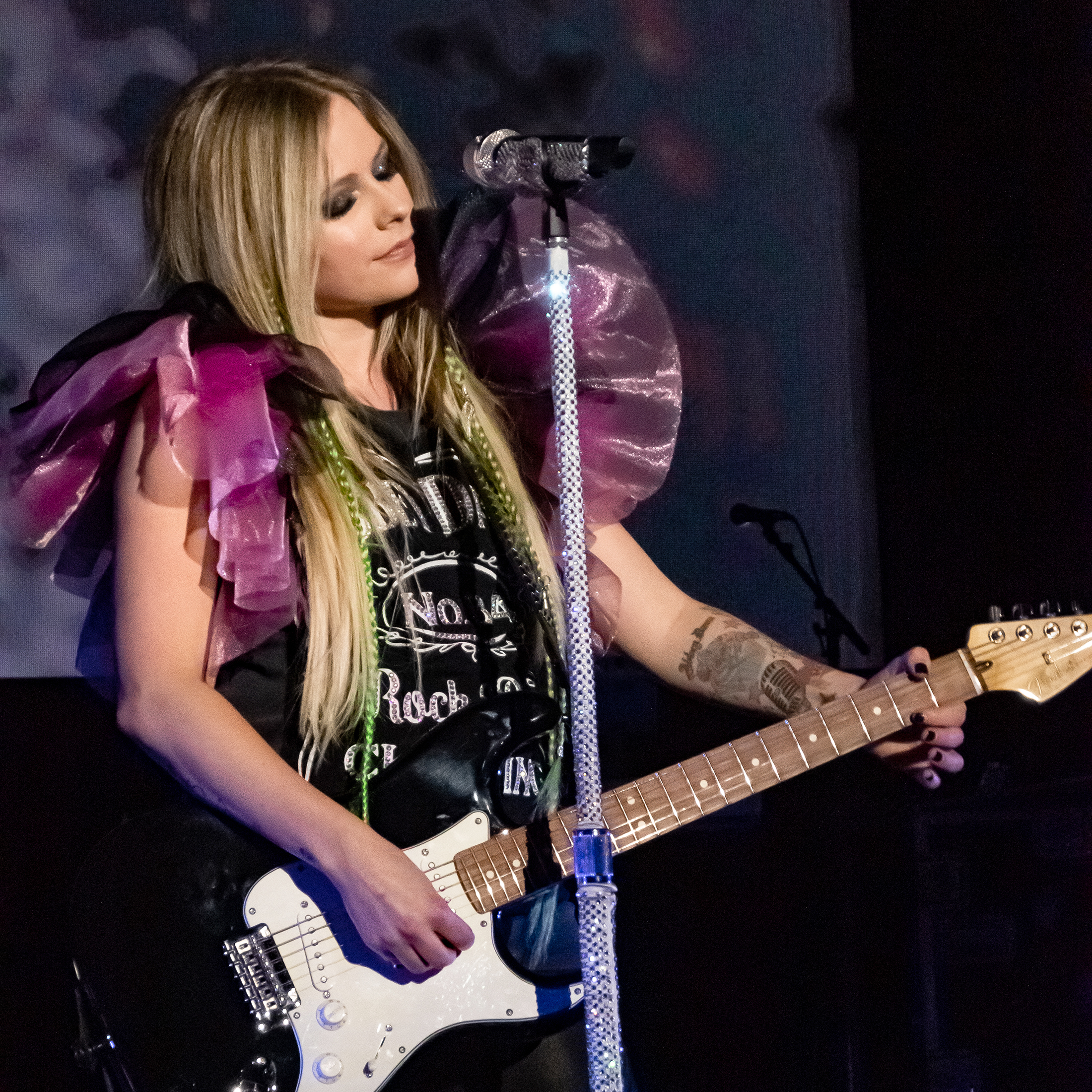
Lavigne performing in September 2019

Lavigne's sixth album Head Above Water was released on February 15, 2019, through BMG. The album reached the top ten in Australia, Austria, Canada, Germany, Italy, Japan, Switzerland and the United Kingdom, and peaked at number thirteen on the US Billboard 200. It was preceded by three singles: "Head Above Water", "Tell Me It's Over" and "Dumb Blonde", with the lead single drawing inspiration from Lavigne's battle with Lyme disease. The fourth single, "I Fell in Love with the Devil", was released on June 28, 2019. In support of the album, Lavigne embarked on the Head Above Water Tour, which started on September 14, 2019. European concerts were postponed to 2022 due to the COVID-19 pandemic.

On April 24, 2020, Lavigne re-recorded the track "Warrior" from her sixth album and released it as a single, titled "We Are Warriors". The proceeds from the single support Project HOPE's relief efforts in the COVID-19 pandemic.

=== 2021–present: Love Sux ===
On January 8, 2021, "Flames", a collaboration between Mod Sun and Lavigne, was released. In the subsequent month, Lavigne confirmed recording for her next album had been completed.

On July 16, 2021, Willow Smith released her fourth album, titled Lately I Feel Everything, with one of the tracks, "Grow", featuring Avril Lavigne and Travis Barker. A music video for the song was released in October of the same year.

After announcing on November 3, 2021, that she had signed with Barker's label DTA Records, Lavigne announced her new single titled "Bite Me", which was released on November 10. On January 13, 2022, Lavigne announced her seventh album Love Sux. Much of the album was written and produced by Lavigne's then boyfriend, pop punk artist Mod Sun. The second single off the record, "Love It When You Hate Me", was released on January 14, and featured American singer Blackbear. The album was subsequently released on February 25. Love Sux debuted at number nine on the Billboard 200 chart, and at number three on the Billboard Canadian Albums chart.

On June 13, 2022, a new edition of Let Go was released for the album's 20th anniversary. The record contains six previously unreleased bonus tracks, including Kelly Clarkson's "Breakaway", which was originally written by Lavigne.

On September 13, 2022, Lavigne attended, presented and performed at the 15th Annual Academy of Country Music (ACM) Honors at the Ryman Auditorium in Nashville, Tennessee. She performed a cover of Shania Twain's "No One Needs to Know" and presented Twain with an ACM Poets Award. The cover received a positive reception.

On October 24, 2022, Lavigne announced the release of a single titled "I'm a Mess" featuring English singer Yungblud on November 3, 2022, as the lead single of the deluxe edition of Love Sux, which was released on November 25. While promoting the single, Lavigne announced she was working on her eighth album with John Feldmann, Barker, Yungblud and Alex Gaskarth. "Fake as Hell", a collaboration between Lavigne and All Time Low, was eventually released as a single on September 15, 2023. On June 9, 2023, Lavigne performed live with country music artist Miranda Lambert during the 2023 CMA Fest at Nissan Stadium in Nashville, Tennessee. They performed a mashup of Lambert's "Kerosene" and Lavigne's "Sk8er Boi".

On May 10, 2024, Lavigne announced plans to release a greatest hits album on June 21, 2024. On May 16, 2024, Lavigne and country music artist Nate Smith released a collaborative single titled "Bulletproof" that was originally released as a solo single for Smith. Lavigne and Smith performed the song at the 59th Academy of Country Music Awards. In support of the album, Lavigne embarked her Greatest Hits Tour, which began on May 22, 2024, and concluded on September 18, 2024. On June 30, 2024, Lavigne played the Glastonbury Festival in England for the first time, drawing one of the largest crowds ever seen at the Other Stage.

On October 3, 2024, it was reported that Lavigne recorded another collaborative single with Smith titled "Can You Die from a Broken Heart". The song is featured on Smith's second album California Gold and it was released as the third single from the album.

In 2025, Lavigne was featured on the single "77", which was featured on Billy Idol's album Dream Into It. They performed the song together on the April 28 episode of Jimmy Kimmel Live!. On May 9, 2025, Lavigne released the single "Young & Dumb", featuring Simple Plan. Simple Plan and Lavigne had first toured together on Lavigne's first tour, the Try To Shut Me Up Tour, from 2002 until its conclusion in 2003, which served as the inspiration for the song.

== Artistry ==
=== Musical style ===
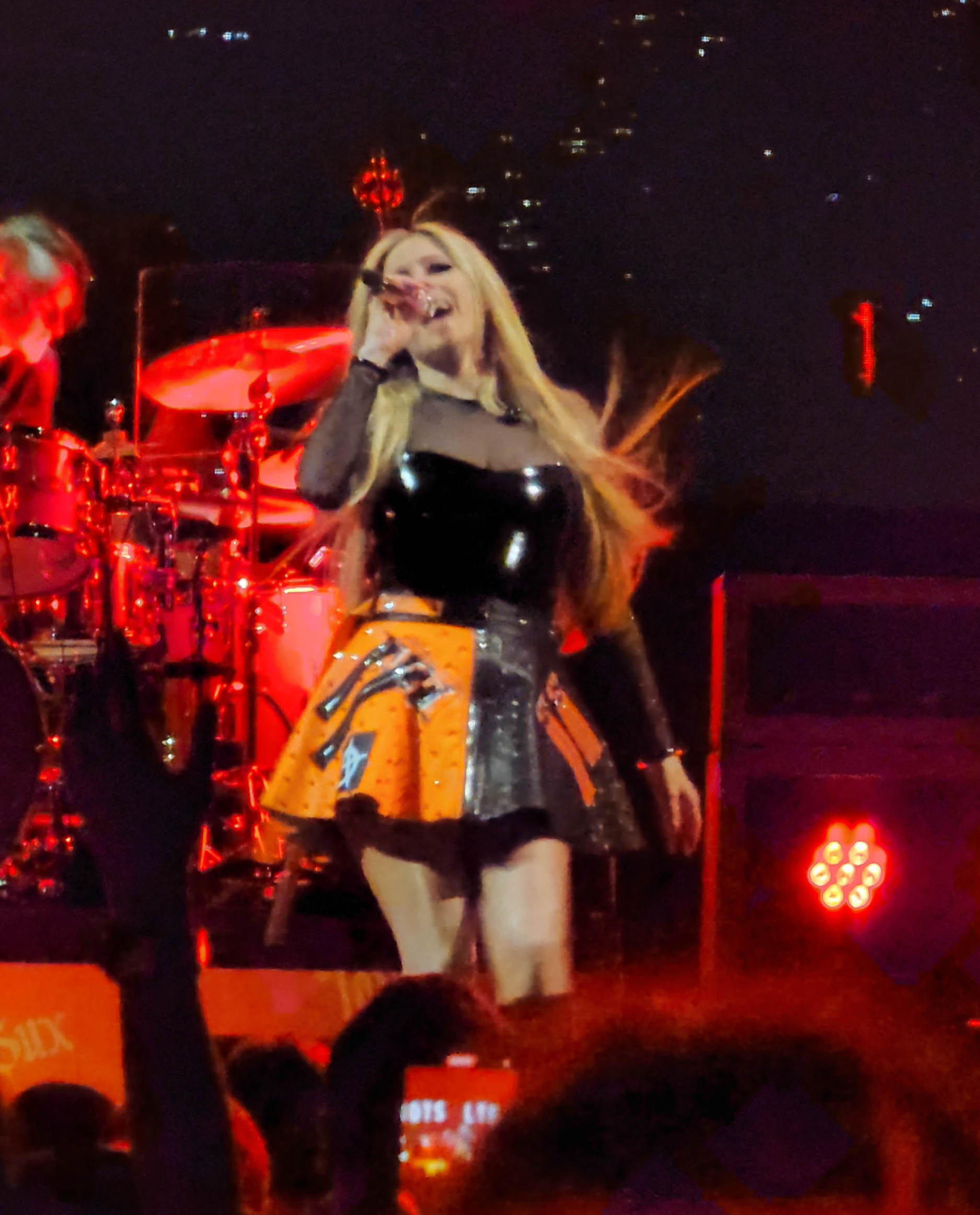
Lavigne performing at Caesars Windsor in 2022

Most critics have identified Lavigne as a pop, pop-punk, pop rock, power pop, alternative rock, and teen pop musician. Her first three albums were described as a mix of pop-punk, alternative rock and pop rock, with elements of post-grunge. Teen pop was also a major influence on Lavigne's first three albums, as most of her lyrics were from an adolescent perspective. This led critics to describe her music as alternateen or teen punk.

Her debut album, Let Go, has a slight grunge influence, while Lavigne, herself, was compared to other female artists with a similar sound, mainly Alanis Morissette. Her second album, Under My Skin, was noticeably darker, with heavier production, more ballads and a post-grunge sound that verged on nu metal, while keeping pop-punk influenced power chords. The album was seen as anticipating the "emotional intensity and theatrical aesthetics" of emo-pop before it came into the mainstream, and has been compared to heavier bands like Linkin Park and Evanescence. In contrast, The Best Damn Thing is more simplistic pop-punk that Blender wrote "sounded like Toni Basil cheerleading for Blink-182." Lavigne was praised for her ability to combine bubblegum pop melodies with punk rock riffs on the album.

Lavigne's sound went softer and poppier on her fourth and sixth albums, Goodbye Lullaby and Head Above Water respectively. They are characterised more by acoustic pop rock and less guitar-driven songs that were a signature of her earlier works. Despite this, songs on both albums have been labelled as pop-punk, including "Dumb Blonde" on the latter, a collaboration with Trinidadian rapper Nicki Minaj, with elements of hip-hop. Meanwhile, her fifth album, Avril Lavigne, is more diverse, with a mix of dance-pop and harsher rock tracks, including "Hello Kitty", that experiments with J-pop, dubstep and EDM, and "Bad Girl", a collaboration with American rock musician Marilyn Manson, considered one of her heaviest songs. Lavigne returned to her pop-punk roots on her seventh album Love Sux, with the mainstream resurgence of the genre. She embraced emo-pop angst, and skate punk influences from NOFX, Blink-182, Green Day and the Offspring.

Lavigne possesses a soprano vocal range. Pat Blashill of Rolling Stone, in a review of "Sk8er Boi", described her voice as "equal parts baby girl and husky siren". Themes in her music include messages of self-empowerment from a female or an adolescent perspective. Lavigne believes her "songs are about being yourself no matter what and going after your dreams even if your dreams are crazy and even if people tell you they're never going to come true." Ian McKellen defined her as "a punk chanteuse, a post-grunge valkyrie, with the wounded soul of a poet and the explosive pugnacity of a Canadian" on The Late Late Show with Craig Ferguson in 2007.

=== Songwriting ===
I know my fans look up to me and that's why I make my songs so personal; it's all about things I've experienced and things I like or hate. I write for myself and hope that my fans like what I have to say.

— Lavigne on her musical artistry

On her debut album, Let Go, Lavigne preferred the less mainstream songs, such as "Losing Grip", instead of her more radio-friendly singles, such as "Complicated", saying that "the songs I did with the Matrix ... were good for my first record, but I don't want to be that pop anymore." Lavigne's second album, Under My Skin, had deeper personal themes underlying each song, with Lavigne remarking that "I've gone through so much, so that's what I talk about ... Like boys, like dating or relationships." In contrast, her third album, The Best Damn Thing, was not personal to her. "Some of the songs I wrote didn't even mean that much to me. It's not like some personal thing I'm going through." Her objective in writing the album was simply to "make it fun". Goodbye Lullaby, her fourth album, was much more personal than her earlier records, with Lavigne describing the album as "more stripped down, deeper. All the songs are very emotional."

While Lavigne said she was not angry, her interviews were still passionate about the media's lack of respect for her songwriting. She said, "I am a writer, and I won't accept people trying to take that away from me", adding that she had been writing "full-structured songs" since she was 14. Despite this, Lavigne's songwriting has been questioned throughout her career. The songwriting trio the Matrix, with whom Lavigne wrote songs for Let Go, claimed they were the main songwriters of her singles "Complicated", "Sk8er Boi" and "I'm with You". Lavigne said that she was the primary songwriter for every song on the album, stating that "[N]one of those songs aren't from me".

In 2007, Chantal Kreviazuk, who wrote with Lavigne on Under My Skin, accused her of plagiarism and criticised her songwriting, saying that "Avril doesn't really sit and write songs by herself or anything." Lavigne also disclaimed this, and considered taking legal action against Kreviazuk for "clear defamation" against her character. Kreviazuk later apologised, saying that "Avril is an accomplished songwriter and it has been my privilege to work with her." Shortly after that, Tommy Dunbar, founder of the band the Rubinoos, sued Lavigne, her publishing company, and Lukasz "Dr. Luke" Gottwald for allegedly stealing parts of "I Wanna Be Your Boyfriend" for her song "Girlfriend". Gottwald defended Lavigne, stating, "me and Avril wrote the song together... It has the same chord progressions as ten different Blink-182 songs, the standard changes you'd find in a Sum 41 song. It's the Sex Pistols, not the Rubinoos." In January 2008, a confidential settlement was reached between the parties.

=== Influences ===
Lavigne's earlier influences came from country music acts such as Garth Brooks, the Chicks, and Shania Twain, and alternative singer-songwriters such as Alanis Morissette, Lisa Loeb, Natalie Imbruglia, and Janis Joplin. By the time she left school to focus on her music career, Lavigne was musically more influenced by skate punk, pop punk, and punk rock acts such as Blink-182, the Offspring, Sum 41, NOFX, Pennywise, Green Day, the Ramones, the Distillers, and Hole. She also enjoyed metal bands such as Marilyn Manson and System of a Down, as well as alternative bands such as Nirvana, No Doubt, the Goo Goo Dolls, Radiohead, the Cranberries, Coldplay, Oasis, Third Eye Blind, Matchbox Twenty, Incubus, Dashboard Confessional and the Used. Lavigne described Third Eye Blind's self-titled debut studio album as one of the biggest influences in her music career.

Because of these influences, musical genres, and Lavigne's personal style, the media often defined her as punk, something she said she was not. Lavigne's close friend and first guitarist, Evan Taubenfeld, said: "It's a very touchy subject to a lot of people, but the point is that Avril isn't punk, but she never really pretended to claim to come from that scene. She had pop punk music and the media ended up doing the rest." Lavigne commented on the matter: "I have been labelled like I'm this angry girl, [a] rebel ... punk, and I am so not any of them." However, she has also said that her music has punk influences: "I like to listen a lot to punk rock music, you can notice a certain influence of punk in my music. I like an aggressive music, but pretty enough heavy pop-rock, which is what I really do." In other interviews, she similarly described her sound as drawing from multiple styles, explaining: "For me and my music, I've always had a connection to pop-rock, pop-punk, rock and roll, and emo music. I've always had that element in my albums, and it's always been with me — at all of my shows, all of my concerts."

== Image ==
I have to fight to keep my image really me ... I rejected some gorgeous publicity shots because they just didn't look like me. I won't wear skanky clothes that show my booty, my belly or my boobs. I have a great body.

— Lavigne on her image early in her career

When Lavigne first gained publicity, she was known for her tomboyish style, in particular her necktie-and-tank-top combinations. She preferred baggy clothes, skater shoes or Converses, wristbands, and sometimes shoelaces wrapped around her fingers. During photo shoots, instead of wearing "glittery get-ups", she preferred wearing "old, crumpled T's". In response to her fashion and musical influences, the media called her the "pop punk princess" and the female answer to Blink-182. Press and fans regarded her as the "anti-Britney", in part because of her "real" image, but also because she was noticeably headstrong. "I'm not made up and I'm not being told what to say and how to act, so they have to call me the anti-Britney, which I'm not." By November 2002, however, Lavigne stopped wearing ties, claiming she felt she was "wearing a costume". Lavigne made a conscious effort to keep her music, and not her image, at the forefront of her career.

Lavigne eventually took on a more gothic style as she began her second album, Under My Skin, trading her skating outfits for black tutus and developing an image marked by angst. During The Best Damn Thing years, Lavigne changed directions. She dyed her hair blonde with a pink streak, wore feminine outfits, including "tight jeans and heels", and modelled for magazines such as Harper's Bazaar. Lavigne defended her new style: "I don't really regret anything. You know, the ties and the wife-beaters and all ... It had its time and place. And now I'm all grown up, and I've moved on".

Lavigne has been the subject of a conspiracy theory that posits that she committed suicide in 2003 and was replaced by a body double who had previously been recruited to distract paparazzi. This originated as a joke on a Brazilian blog, but it has since been embraced by some conspiracy theorists in earnest. In an interview with Australia's KIIS 106.5 in November 2018, Lavigne responded to the rumour, stating: "Yeah, some people think that I'm not the real me, which is so weird! Like, why would they even think that?"

== Legacy ==
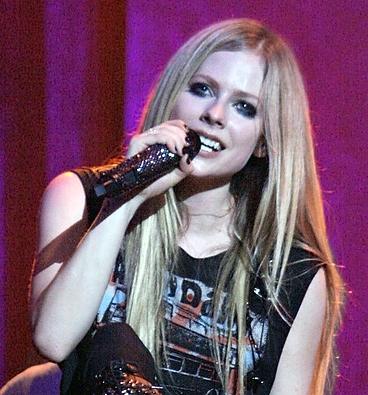
Lavigne performing in 2011 during her Black Star Tour

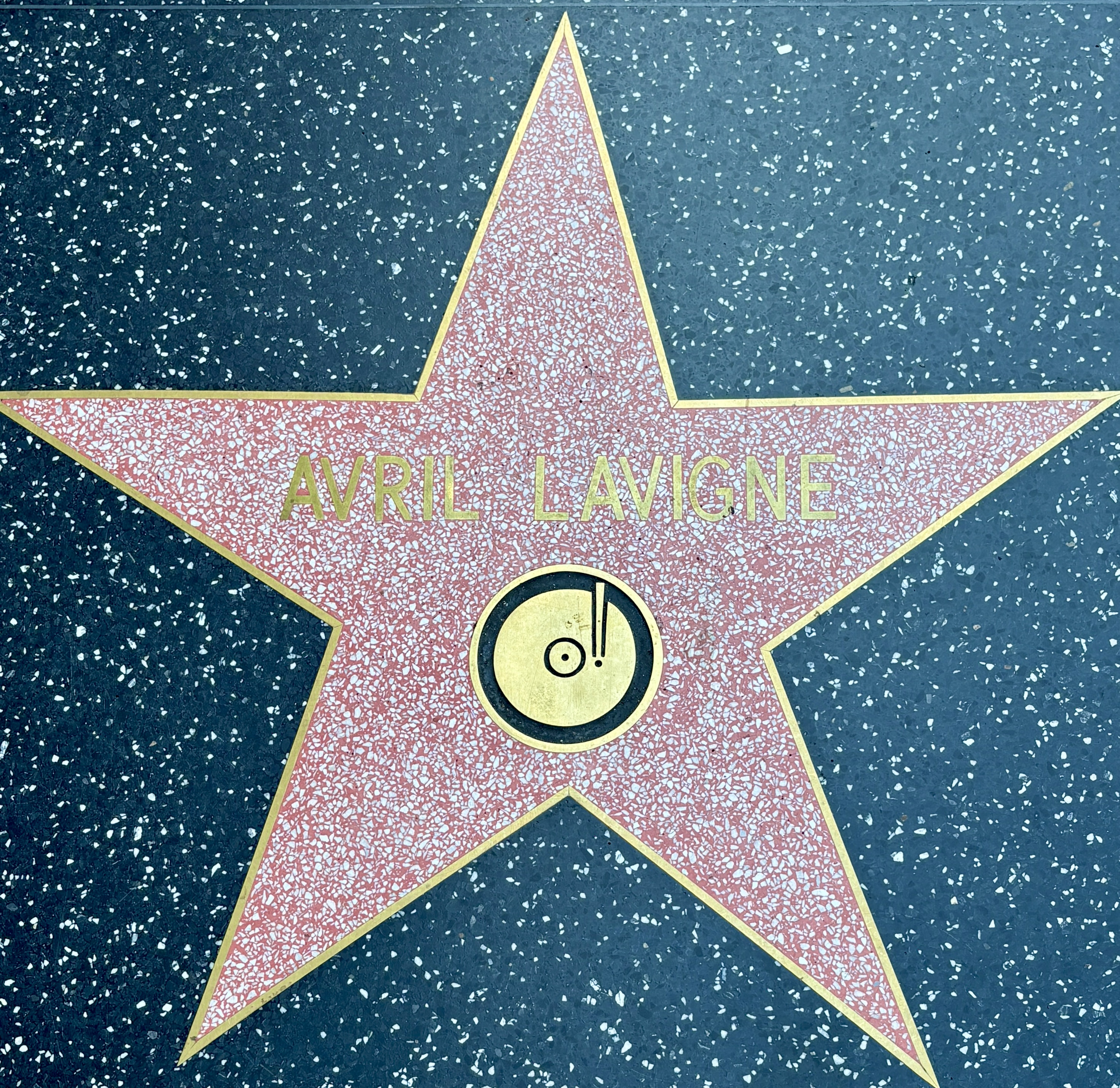
Hollywood Walk of Fame star

Lavigne has been called the greatest female representative of pop-punk music and one of the female singers who best represent 2000s rock music.

She has been compared to alternative female singer-songwriters of the 1990s such as Alanis Morissette, Liz Phair, and Courtney Love, Lavigne also was seen as a fashion icon for her skatepunk and rocker style. "Sk8er Boi", "He Wasn't", and "Girlfriend" are frequently listed among the best pop-punk songs of all time by critics.

She helped pave the way for female-driven punk-influenced pop artists such as Paramore, Skye Sweetnam, Fefe Dobson, Lillix, Kelly Osbourne, Krystal Meyers, Tonight Alive, Courage My Love, and Hey Monday. She has influenced a wide array of musical artists, including acts such as Tramp Stamps, Bebe Rexha, Billie Eilish, Courage My Love, 5 Seconds of Summer, Yungblud, Maggie Lindemann, Tonight Alive, Willow Smith, Amanda Palmer, Misono, Rina Sawayama, Hey Monday, Grey, Ed Sheeran, Kailee Morgue, Charli XCX, MercyMe, Palberta, Yeule, Ashnikko, Olivia Rodrigo, and Kirstin Maldonado. Amy Studt was hailed as "the U.K.'s answer" to Avril Lavigne. Lavigne influenced indie rock singer-songwriters such as beabadoobee, Pale Waves, Graace, Phoebe Bridgers, Soccer Mommy, Ethel Cain, Snail Mail, and Liz Phair.

Nylon magazine discussed her impact on hip-hop artists, including Lil Uzi Vert, Princess Nokia, Lloyd Banks, Vic Mensa, Nipsey Hussle, Noname, and Rico Nasty. American rapper Fat Tony said she influenced hip hop and rap music because "she delivered a great visual catchy package [punk music, pop music and skater culture] that describes all of them." Rico Nasty named one of her alter egos, Trap Lavigne, saying "She is a perfect representation of being hard and soft [...] she hated the term punk, but she was so punk rock".

A persistent internet meme about a Lavigne-written song called "Dolphins" has been showing up on various lyric sites since 2007, but she did not write or record this song. The lyrics appear on dozens of lyric sites and various bands have recorded cover versions of the song that was never recorded by Lavigne.

Lavigne's early pop-punk image influenced portrayals of teenage rebellion in early-2000s popular culture. Lindsay Lohan stated that her portrayal of Anna Coleman in the 2003 film Freaky Friday was inspired by Lavigne's style, attitude, and skate-punk aesthetic. In mid-2007, Lavigne was featured in a two-volume graphic novel, Avril Lavigne's Make 5 Wishes. She collaborated with artist Camilla d'Errico and writer Joshua Dysart on the manga, which was about a shy girl named Hana who, upon meeting her hero, Lavigne, learned to overcome her fears. Lavigne said, "I know that many of my fans read manga, and I'm really excited to be involved in creating stories that I know they will enjoy." The first volume was released in April 2007, and the second followed in July 2007. The publication Young Adult Library Services nominated the series for "Great Graphic Novels for Teens".

== Achievements ==
In 2003, Lavigne won an International Achievement Award for the song "Complicated" at the SOCAN Awards in Toronto. Lavigne received eight Grammy Awards nominations in two years, including Best New Artist. She has also received three American Music Awards nominations, one Brit Award nomination, and one MTV Video Music Award. Lavigne had sold more than 30 million singles and 40 million copies of her albums worldwide, including over 12.4 million album copies in the US according to Billboard. In 2009, Billboard named Lavigne the number 10 pop artist in the "Best of the 2000s" chart. She was listed as the 28th overall best act of the decade based on album and single chart performance in the US. The magazine later ranked her at number 19 on its 2025 "Top Women Artists of the 21st Century" list.

Lavigne achieved a Guinness World Record as being the youngest female solo artist to top the UK album chart, on January 11, 2003, at the age of 18 years and 106 days. The album Let Go reached number one in its 18th chart week. She held the record until 2004, as the UK charts reported that Joss Stone's Mind Body & Soul took it the following year. She also was the first to reach 100 million views on a YouTube video, with her 2007 single "Girlfriend". Lavigne was the first western artist to do a full tour in China, with The Best Damn Tour in 2008, and is considered the biggest western artist in Asia, especially in Japan, where her first three albums have sold more than 1 million copies (being the only female Western Artist since the 2000s to achieve this). Lavigne is the only artist to have performed at three different multi-sport events: two closing ceremonies of the Winter Olympic Games (Torino 2006 and Vancouver 2010) and the opening ceremony of the 2015 Special Olympics World Summer Games. In June 2024, she was conferred with the Order of Canada.

== Other activities ==
=== Acting career ===
Lavigne became interested in appearing on television and in feature films. The decision, she said, was her own. Although her years of experience in making music videos was to her advantage, Lavigne admitted her experience in singing removed any fear of performing on camera. She specifically mentioned that the video "Nobody's Home" involved the most "acting". Her first television appearance was in a 2002 episode of Sabrina, the Teenage Witch, performing "Sk8er Boi" with her band in a nightclub. She later made a cameo appearance in the 2004 film Going the Distance. The main characters bump into her backstage at the MuchMusic Video Awards after her performance of "Losing Grip".

She moved into feature film acting cautiously, deliberately choosing small roles to begin with. In November 2005, after going through an audition to land the role, Lavigne travelled to New Mexico to film a single scene in the 2007 film, The Flock. She played Beatrice Bell, the girlfriend of a crime suspect, appearing alongside Claire Danes and Richard Gere. Gere gave Lavigne acting tips between takes. On her role in The Flock, Lavigne said, "I did that just to see how it was and to not jump into [mainstream acting] too fast." The Flock was not released in American theatres, and because it was not released in foreign markets until late 2007, it is not considered Lavigne's debut. The film made $7 million in the foreign box office.

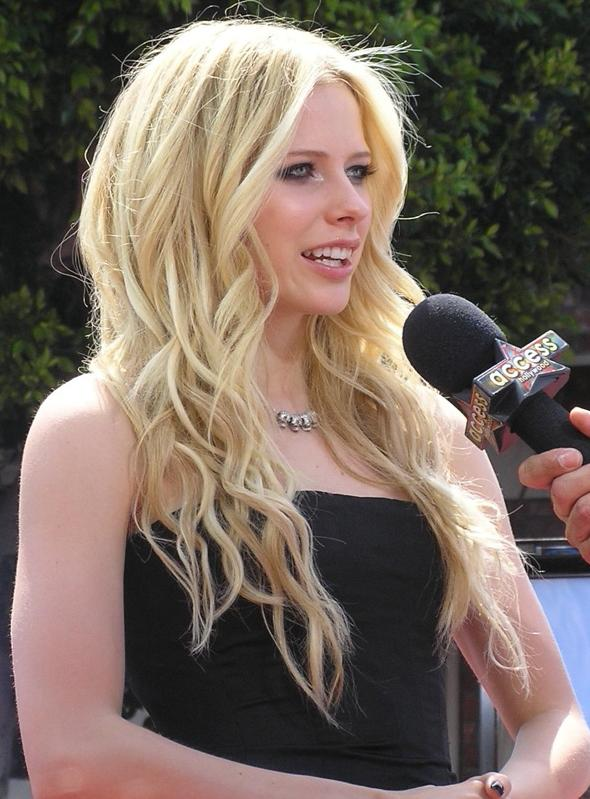
Lavigne at the 2006 Cannes Film Festival

Lavigne's feature film debut was voicing an animated character in the 2006 film Over the Hedge, based on the comic strip of the same name. She voiced the character Heather, a Virginia opossum. Lavigne found the recording process to be "easy" and "natural", but she kept hitting the microphone as she gestured while acting. "I'd use my hands constantly and, like, hit the microphone stand and make noises, so [director] Tim and [screenwriter] Karey had to tell me to hold still.... It's hard to be running or falling down the stairs and have to make those sounds come out of your mouth but keep your body still." Lavigne believed she was hired to perform Heather because of her rock-star status. "[The director] thought I'd give my character... a bit of attitude". The film opened on May 19, 2006, making $38 million over its opening weekend. It went on to gross $336 million worldwide.

In December 2005, Lavigne signed to appear in Fast Food Nation, based on the book Fast Food Nation: The Dark Side of the All-American Meal. The fictionalised adaptation, directed by Richard Linklater, traces fast-food hamburgers contaminated with cow feces back to the slaughterhouses. Lavigne played Alice, a high school student intent on freeing the cows. The film opened on November 17, 2006, and remained in theatres for 11 weeks, grossing $2 million worldwide.

Both Over the Hedge and Fast Food Nation opened at the 2006 Cannes Film Festival, which Lavigne attended. When asked if she would pursue her film career, she stated that she wanted to take her time and wait for the "right parts and the right movies." Lavigne was deliberate in the roles she had chosen, saying "I wanted to start off small and to learn. I wouldn't just want to throw myself into a big part." In August 2006, Canadian Business magazine ranked her as the seventh top Canadian actor in Hollywood in their second annual Celebrity Power List ranking. The results were determined by comparing salary, Internet hits, TV mentions, and press hits. In September 2011, Lavigne appeared on the Hub Network's televised singing competition Majors & Minors as a guest mentor alongside other singers, including Adam Lambert and Leona Lewis.

=== Products and endorsements ===
After the release of my first album, I realized how much fashion was involved in my musical career.

— Lavigne on fashion and music

In July 2008, Lavigne launched the clothing line Abbey Dawn, featuring a back-to-school collection. It is produced by Kohl's, which is the brand's exclusive US retailer. Named after Lavigne's childhood nickname, Abbey Dawn is designed by Lavigne herself. Kohl's describes Abbey Dawn as a "juniors lifestyle brand", which incorporates skull, zebra, and star patterns, purples and "hot pinks and blacks". Lavigne, who wore some of the clothes and jewellery from her line at various concerts before its official launch, pointed out that she was not merely licensing her name to the collection. "I actually am the designer. What's really important to me is that everything fits well and is well-made, so I try everything on and approve it all." The designs were also featured on the Internet game Stardoll, where figures can be dressed up as Lavigne.

It's fun to be a chick and design clothes and things I'd like for myself. I design things I [can't] find.

— Lavigne on designing clothes

On September 14, 2009, Lavigne took the then latest collection of her clothing line to be a part of New York Fashion Week, returning in 2011. In December 2010, the clothing line was made available to over 50 countries through the line's official website.

Lavigne released her first fragrance, Black Star, created by Procter & Gamble Prestige Products. The fragrance was announced on Lavigne's official website on March 7, 2009. Black Star, which features notes of pink hibiscus, black plum and dark chocolate, was released in summer 2009 in Europe, and later in the US and Canada. When asked what the name meant, Lavigne replied, "I wanted [the bottle] to be a star, and my colours are pink and black, and Black Star resembles being different, and standing out in the crowd, and reaching for the stars; the whole message is just about following your dreams, and it's okay to be unique and be who you are." Black Star won the 2010 Best "Women's Scent Mass" by Cosmetic Executive Women (CEW). Black Star was followed by a second fragrance in July 2010, Forbidden Rose, which took two years to develop. It features notes of red apple, winepeach, black pepper, lotusflower, heliotrope, shellflower, praline agreement, sandalwood, and vanilla. Its message is an extension of Black Star's "follow your dreams", though the tagline for the new perfume is "Dare to Discover". The commercial takes place in a gothic garden setting, where Lavigne, upon entering the garden, finds a single, purple rose. Lavigne launched a third fragrance, Wild Rose, in August 2011 and filmed the commercial for it in late 2010. The tagline for the fragrance is "Dare to discover more". It features notes of mandarin, pink grapefruit, plum, orange blossom, frangipani, blue orchid, musk, sandalwood and crème brûlée.

In January 2010, Lavigne began working with Disney to incorporate Alice in Wonderland-inspired designs into her Abbey Dawn line of clothing. Her designs were exhibited at the Fashion Institute of Design & Merchandising in California beginning in May through September, alongside Colleen Atwood's costumes from the 2010 film.

=== Philanthropy ===
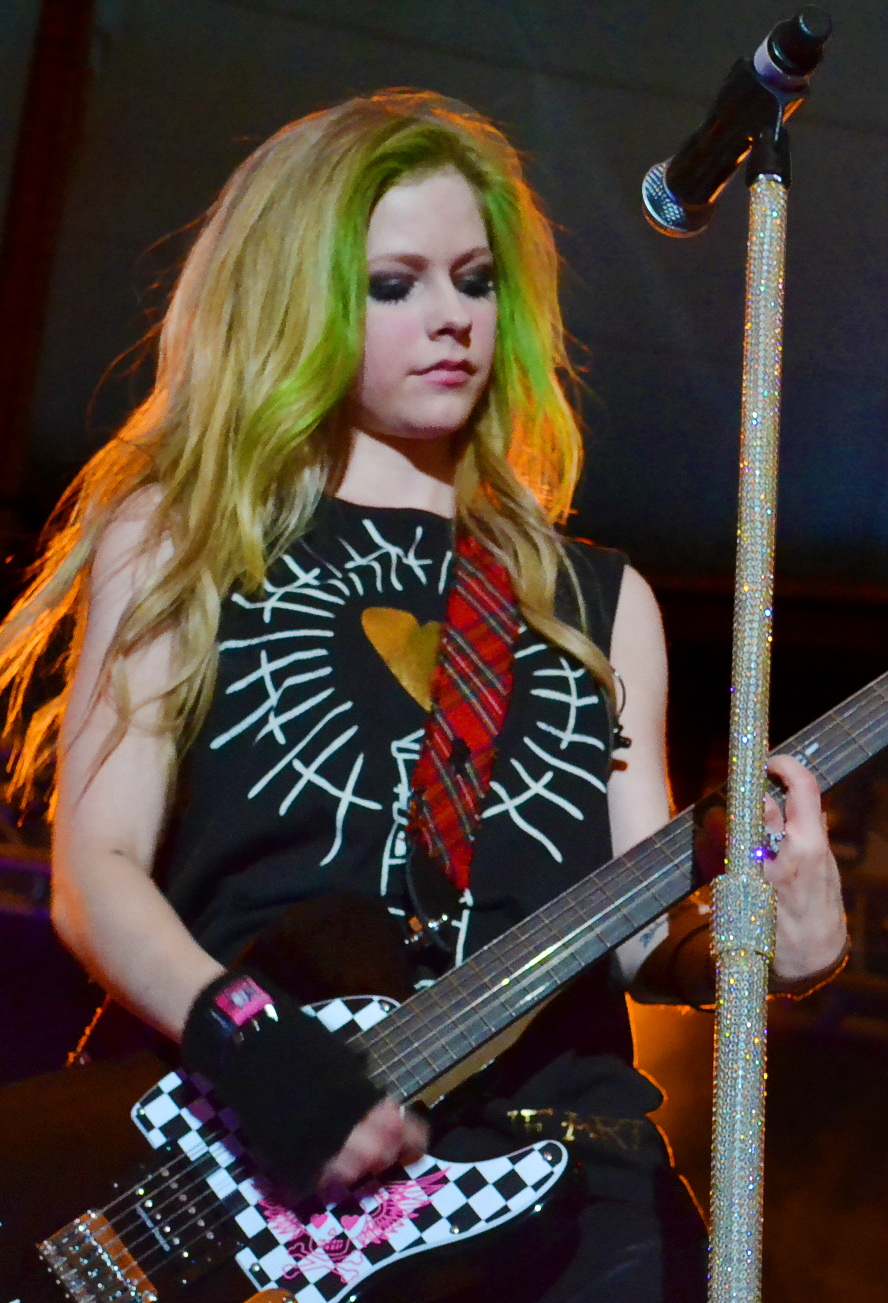
Lavigne performing in 2011

Lavigne has been involved with many charities, including Make Some Noise, Amnesty International, Erase MS, AmericanCPR.org, Special Olympics, Camp Will-a-Way, Music Clearing Minefields, US Campaign for Burma, Make-A-Wish Foundation and War Child. She has also appeared in ALDO ads with YouthAIDS to raise money to educate people worldwide about HIV/AIDS. Lavigne took part in the Unite Against AIDS concert presented by ALDO in support of UNICEF on November 28, 2007, at the Bell Centre in Montréal, Québec, Canada. In November 2010, Lavigne attended the Clinton Global Initiative.

Lavigne worked with Reverb, a non-profit environmental organisation, for her 2005 east coast tour. She covered "Knockin' on Heaven's Door" for War Child's Peace Songs compilation, and she recorded a cover of the John Lennon song "Imagine" as her contribution to the compilation album Instant Karma: The Amnesty International Campaign to Save Darfur. Released on June 12, 2007, the album was produced to benefit Amnesty International's campaign to alleviate the crisis in Darfur.

On December 5, 2009, Lavigne returned to the stage in Mexico City during the biggest charity event in Latin America, "Teleton". She performed acoustic versions of her hits "Complicated" and "Girlfriend" with Evan Taubenfeld and band member, Jim McGorman. In 2010, Lavigne was one of several artists who contributed their voices to a cover of K'naan's "Wavin' Flag" as a benefit single to help raise money for several charity organisations related to the 2010 Haiti earthquake.

On September 14, 2010, Lavigne introduced her charity, "The Avril Lavigne Foundation", which aims to help young people with serious illnesses and disabilities and works with leading charitable organisations. The foundation partners with the Easter Seals, Make-A-Wish foundation and Erase MS. Her work with the Make-A-Wish foundation was the inspiration behind her own charity, with Lavigne stating, "I just really wanted to do more." Lavigne said on the foundation's website, "I have always looked for ways to give back because I think it's a responsibility we all share." Philanthropist Trevor Neilson's 12-person firm, Global Philanthropy Group, advises Lavigne with her foundation as well as several other celebrities, including musician John Legend.

In September 2014, she launched a personal fundraising campaign for the Special Olympics as part of her birthday celebration. Proceeds from her "Team Rockstar" event helped sponsor athletes from around the world competing in the 2015 Special Olympics World Summer Games in Los Angeles. The athletes were the stars of the music video for "Fly", which was shot in Canada.

In September 2020, Lavigne announced a special livestream concert to raise awareness and funds in the fight against Lyme disease called the #FightLyme concert. The concert took place on October 25, with proceeds from all tickets and merchandise going to the Global Lyme Alliance, a chronic Lyme disease advocacy group, and her charity, the Avril Lavigne Foundation.

=== Politics ===
After winning her fourth Juno Award in April 2003, in reference to the Iraq War, Lavigne said, "I don't believe war is a way to solve problems. I think it's wrong .... I don't have that much respect for [U.S. President George] Bush." She also said that she was "really proud" of then Prime Minister of Canada Jean Chrétien for keeping Canada out of the war.

== Personal life ==
=== French citizenship ===
Lavigne's father was born in France, and through jus sanguinis, she applied for a French passport, which she received in February 2011. In January 2012, Lavigne sold her house in Bel-Air (on the market since May 2011), and moved to Paris to study the French language. She rented an apartment and attended a Berlitz school.

=== Relationships ===
Lavigne and Sum 41 lead vocalist/rhythm guitarist Deryck Whibley began dating when Lavigne was 19 years old, after being friends since she was 17. In June 2005, Whibley proposed to her. The couple married on July 15, 2006, in Montecito, California. On October 9, 2009, Lavigne filed for divorce, citing "irreconcilable differences" as the reason. Lavigne stated, "I am grateful for our time together, and I am grateful and blessed for our remaining friendship." The divorce was finalised on November 16, 2010.

From February 2010 to January 2012, she was dating The Hills star Brody Jenner.

Lavigne began dating fellow Canadian musician Chad Kroeger, frontman of the band Nickelback, in July 2012. The relationship blossomed after they began working together in March 2012 to write and record music for Lavigne's fifth album. Lavigne and Kroeger became engaged in August 2012, after one month of dating. The couple married at the Château de la Napoule, a reconstructed medieval castle on the Mediterranean in the South of France, on July 1, 2013, after a year of being together. On September 2, 2015, Lavigne announced her separation from Kroeger via her official Instagram account, and they later divorced.

From 2018 to 2019, Lavigne dated billionaire heir Phillip Sarofim. It was reported by People magazine that she began dating musician Pete Jonas in 2020. She later began dating Mod Sun around March 2021. In April 2022, Lavigne used her social media accounts to announce their engagement, which ended in February 2023.

On November 13, 2026, Lavigne announced the birth of her daughter. The father's identity has not been made public.

=== Health ===
In April 2015, Lavigne revealed to People magazine that she had been diagnosed with Lyme disease after her 30th birthday in 2014. In an interview with Billboard that same month, Lavigne said that she was in the recovery process and that she wanted to increase awareness of the disease.

== Discography ==
- Let Go (2002)
- Under My Skin (2004)
- The Best Damn Thing (2007)
- Goodbye Lullaby (2011)
- Avril Lavigne (2013)
- Head Above Water (2019)
- Love Sux (2022)

== Filmography ==
Film and television
Year	Title	Role	Notes
2002	Sabrina the Teenage Witch	Herself	Cameo appearance; episode: "Bada-Ping!"
2003	Saturday Night Live	Herself	Season 28, episode 9: "Jeff Gordon/Avril Lavigne"
2004	Going the Distance	Herself	Cameo appearance; performed "Losing Grip"
2004	Saturday Night Live	Herself	Season 29, episode 19: "Snoop Dogg/Avril Lavigne"
2006	Over the Hedge	Heather (voice)	
2006	Fast Food Nation	Alice	
2007	The Flock	Beatrice Bell	
2010	American Idol	Guest Judge	Los Angeles auditions
2011	Majors & Minors	Guest Mentor	
2012	Katy Perry: Part of Me	Herself	
2018	Charming	Snow White (voice)	
2022	Good Mourning	Herself	
2024	Angry Birds Mystery Island	Tuba	

== Tours ==
Headlining

- Try to Shut Me Up Tour (2002–2003)
- Bonez Tour (2004–2005)
- The Best Damn Tour (2008)
- Black Star Tour (2011–2012)
- The Avril Lavigne Tour (2013–2014)
- Head Above Water Tour (2019)
- Love Sux Tour (2022–2023)
- Greatest Hits Tour (2024–2025)

Promotional

- Live by Surprise Tour (2004)
- The Best Damn Thing Promotional Tour (2007)

Opening act

- In a World Like This Tour (for the Backstreet Boys) (2014)
- Mainstream Sellout Tour (for Machine Gun Kelly) (2022)

== See also ==
- Honorific nicknames in popular music
- List of artists who reached number one in the United States
