= List of awards and nominations received by Avril Lavigne =

Avril Lavigne awards and nominations
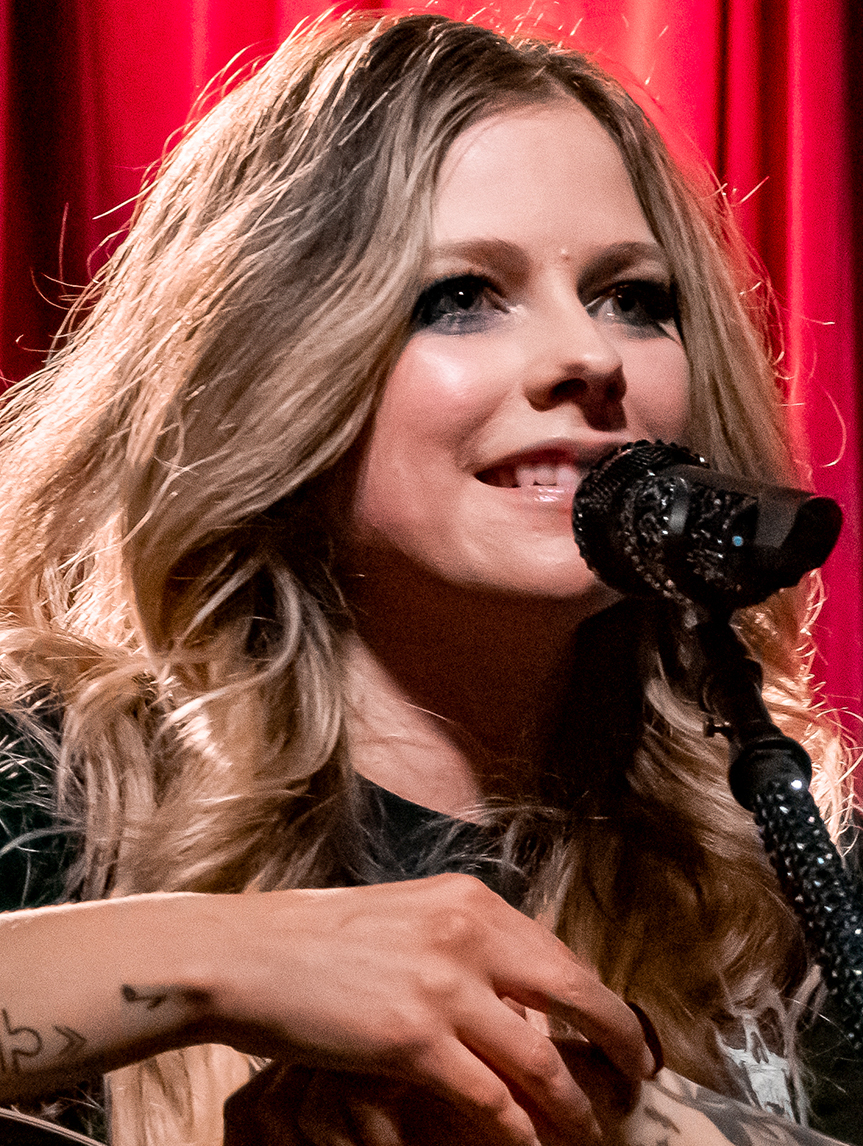
- Lavigne performing at the Grammy Museum in September, 2019.
Awards and nominations
Award	Wins	Nominations
AG Canadian Hair Cosmetics Awards	2	2
American Music Awards	0	3
Amigo Awards	0	1
APRA Music Awards	0	1
ASCAP Film and Television Music Awards	1	1
ASCAP Pop Music Awards	6	6
Billboard Japan Music Awards	1	3
Billboard Music Awards	0	4
Billboard.com Mid-Year Music Awards	0	1
Bravo Otto	2	2
Brit Awards	0	3
Canadian Music & Broadcast Industry Awards	1	1
Canadian Radio Music Awards	7	8
Capricho Awards	7	11
CEW Beauty Awards	1	1
Channel V Thailand Music Video Awards	1	2
Comet Music Awards	1	2
Common Sense Media Award	1	1
Danish Music Awards	1	1
Echo Music Prize	1	4
Edison Music Awards	1	1
FiFi Awards	0	2
GAFFA Awards (Denmark)	1	4
Glamour Awards	0	1
Grammy Awards	0	8
Hong Kong Top Sales Music Awards	3	3
Huading Awards	1	1
Hungarian Music Awards	0	2
ITA Nickelodeon Kids' Choice Awards	1	2
Ivor Novello Awards	1	1
Japan Gold Disc Awards	13	13
Juno Awards	10	31
KKBox Music Awards	1	1
Los Premios MTV Latinoamérica	5	6
Lunas del Auditorio	0	4
Meteor Music Awards	1	1
Meus Prêmios Nick	2	2
MTV Asia Awards	4	6
MTV Europe Music Awards	2	9
MTV Italian Music Awards	5	14
MTV Russia Music Awards	1	1
MTV Video Music Awards	1	7
MTV Video Music Awards Japan	3	11
MTV Video Music Brazil	0	3
MTV Video Play Awards	2	2
MuchMusic Video Awards	8	17
Myx Music Award	0	1
Nickelodeon Australian Kids' Choice Awards	0	1
Nickelodeon Kids' Choice Awards	3	3
Nickelodeon Mexico Kids' Choice Awards	1	2
Nickelodeon UK Kids' Choice Awards	1	2
NME Awards	1	2
NRJ Music Awards	2	3
People Choice Awards	0	1
Planeta Awards	2	4
Premios Oye!	3	5
Radio Disney Music Awards	8	20
Radio Music Awards	1	6
RTHK International Pop Poll Awards	6	6
Satellite Awards	0	1
SOCAN Awards	9	9
Spike Guys Choice Awards	0	1
Teen Choice Awards	3	11
TMF Awards (Belgium)	2	5
TMF Awards (Netherlands)	1	1
Total Request Live Awards	0	1
Virgin Media Music Awards	1	2
V Chart Awards	3	3
VH1 Big Awards	0	2
World Music Awards	6	6
Zamu Music Awards	1	1
Žebřík Music Awards	2	17

Totals (Note: Certain award groups do not simply award one winner. They acknowledge several different recipients, have runners-up, and have third place. Since this is a specific recognition and is different from losing an award, runner-up mentions are considered wins in this award tally. For simplification and to avoid errors, each award in this list has been presumed to have had a prior nomination.)
- Wins: 155
- Nominations: 329

Canadian singer and songwriter Avril Lavigne has received various awards and nominations throughout her career. She is the recipient of seven ASCAP Awards, an Echo Music Prize, a Guinness World Records, ten Juno Awards, eight MuchMusic Video Awards, two NRJ Music Awards, three Teen Choice Awards, six World Music Awards and twenty-three MTV Awards around the world. She has also been nominated for eight Grammy Awards, three American Music Awards, three Brit Awards and four Billboard Music Awards.

Lavigne's debut studio album. Let Go (2002), was certified seven-times Platinum by the Recording Industry Association of America and sold over 16 million copies worldwide. The album won Album of the Year at Juno Awards of 2003, while at the 45th Annual Grammy Awards it was nominated for Best Pop Vocal Album. It spawned two Billboard Hot 100 top-five singles, "Complicated" and "I'm with You" were both nominated for Song of the Year and Best Female Pop Vocal Performance at the Grammy Awards in 2003 and 2004, respectively. The former won an International Achievement Award at the SOCAN Awards in Toronto. She won awards for Best New Artist at several award ceremonies in 2002 and 2003, including MTV Video Music Award for Best New Artist, Juno Award for New Artist of the Year and the Echo Award for Most Successful International Newcomer of the Year.

Lavigne's second album, Under My Skin (2004) It debuted at number one on the Billboard 200 and earned the singer five nominations at the Juno Awards of 2005, winning three of them; Artist of the Year, Juno Fan Choice Award and Pop Album of the Year. Her third album The Best Damn Thing (2007) produced her most successful single to date, "Girlfriend", which peaked at number one on the Billboard Hot 100. Its music video became the first on YouTube to reach 100 million views and became the most watched video of all time on the site in 2008. The single received several awards, including Most Addictive Track at the 2007 MTV Europe Music Awards, Song of the Year at Los Premios MTV Latinoamérica 2007, Choice Music: Single at 2007 Teen Choice Awards, the Nickelodeon Kids' Choice Award for Favorite Song and was nominated for Single of the Year at the Juno Awards of 2008. In addition, Lavigne won International Female Artist of the Year at the 2008 NRJ Music Awards. She also won two consecutive People's Choice Favourite Canadian Artist at the 2007 and 2008 MuchMusic Video Awards.

In January 2010, recorded the song, "Alice" for the Tim Burton's feature film Alice in Wonderland. The song received a nomination for Best Original Song at the Satellite Awards 2010 and won Best Video From a Film at the 2011 MTV Video Music Awards Japan. In the next year, Lavigne released her fourth studio album, Goodbye Lullaby, which peaked at number one in Australia and became her fourth album to reach the top five on the Billboard 200. The album was nominated for Album of the Year and Pop Album of the Year at the Juno Awards of 2012. The first single from the album, "What The Hell", was successful, reaching number one in Japan, the top five in Asia and the Top 10 in Europe. The song won the Billboard Japan Music Award for Hot 100 Airplay of the Year. Her fifth album Avril Lavigne (2013),+ won the RTHK International Pop Poll Award for The Best Selling English Album. The lead single from the album "Here's to Never Growing Up" won International Video of the Year By A Canadian at the 2013 MuchMusic Video Awards.

== Awards and nominations ==
Key
†	Indicates non-competitive categories

Name of the award ceremony, year presented, recipient(s) of the award, award category and the result of the nomination
Award	Year (Note: Indicates the year of ceremony. Each year is linked to the article about the awards held that year, wherever possible.)	Nominee/work	Category	Result	Ref.
AG Canadian Hair Cosmetics Awards	2008	Herself	Favorite Canadian Musician Hair †	Won	
AG Canadian Hair Cosmetics Awards	2010	Herself	Sexiest Hair on a Canadian Musician †	Won	
American Music Awards	2003	Herself	Favorite Pop/Rock Female Artist	Nominated	
American Music Awards	2004	Herself	Favorite Pop/Rock Female Artist	Nominated	
American Music Awards	2007	Herself	Favorite Pop/Rock Female Artist	Nominated	
Amigo Awards	2003	Herself	Best International Artist	Nominated	
APRA Music Awards	2004	"I'm with You"	Most Performed Foreign Work	Nominated	
ASCAP Film and Television Music Awards	2004	"I'm with You"	Most Performed Song from a Motion Picture †	Won	
ASCAP Pop Music Awards	2003	"Complicated"	Most Performed Song †	Won	
ASCAP Pop Music Awards	2004	"Complicated"	Most Performed Song †	Won	
ASCAP Pop Music Awards	2004	"I'm with You"	Most Performed Song †	Won	
ASCAP Pop Music Awards	2006	"Breakaway" (Note: Lavigne co-wrote the song.)	Most Performed Song †	Won	
ASCAP Pop Music Awards	2006	"My Happy Ending"	Most Performed Song †	Won	
ASCAP Pop Music Awards	2008	"Girlfriend"	Most Performed Song †	Won	
Billboard Japan Music Awards	2010	"Alice"	Adult Contemporary of the Year	Nominated	
Billboard Japan Music Awards	2011	Herself	Top Pop Artist of the Year	Nominated	
Billboard Japan Music Awards	2011	"What the Hell"	Hot 100 Airplay of the Year	Won	
Billboard Music Awards	2002	Herself	Top Female Artist of the Year	Nominated	
Billboard Music Awards	2002	Herself	Top New Pop Artist of the Year	Nominated	
Billboard Music Awards	2002	"Complicated"	Top 40 Track of the Year	Nominated	
Billboard Music Awards	2003	"I'm with You"	Mainstream Top 40 Single of the Year	Nominated	
Billboard.com Mid-Year Music Awards	2013	"Here's to Never Growing Up"	Best Music Video	Nominated	
Bravo Otto (Note: At this award show, runners-up are considered winners in spite of being in second or third place.)	2002	Herself	Female Singer	Silver	
Bravo Otto	2002	Herself	Shooting Star Solo †	Gold	
Brit Awards	2003	Herself	International Breakthrough Act	Nominated	
Brit Awards	2003	Herself	International Female Solo Artist	Nominated	
Brit Awards	2005	Herself	British Pop Act	Nominated	
Canadian Music & Broadcast Industry Awards	2003	Herself	Canadian Talent Development Story of the Year †	Won	
Canadian Radio Music Awards	2003	"Complicated"	Best New Solo Mainstream AC/Hot AC	Won	
Canadian Radio Music Awards	2003	"Complicated"	Best New CHR Solo	Won	
Canadian Radio Music Awards	2003	"Losing Grip"	Best New Rock/Alternative	Won	
Canadian Radio Music Awards	2003	Herself	Socan Songwriter Award †	Won	
Canadian Radio Music Awards	2003	Herself	Fan Choice Award	Won	
Canadian Radio Music Awards	2004	Herself	Fan Choice Award	Won	
Canadian Radio Music Awards	2005	Herself	Fan Choice Award	Won	
Canadian Radio Music Awards	2008	Herself	Fan Choice Award	Nominated	
Capricho Awards	2004	"My Happy Ending"	International Song	Won	
Capricho Awards	2004	Herself	International Singer	Won	
Capricho Awards	2004	Herself	Most Stylish International	Won	
Capricho Awards	2007	Herself	International Singer	Nominated	
Capricho Awards	2008	Herself	Most Stylish International	Won	
Capricho Awards	2008	"Girlfriend"	Best Video at YouTube	Nominated	
Capricho Awards	2011	The Black Star Tour	Best Live Concert	Won	
Capricho Awards	2011	Herself	International Singer	Won	
Capricho Awards	2011	Herself	Most Stylish International	Won	
Capricho Awards	2012	Herself	Notice of the Year	Nominated	
Capricho Awards	2014	Herself	Meme of the Year	Nominated	
CEW Beauty Awards	2010	Black Star	Woman's Secent Mass	Won	
Channel [V] Thailand Music Video Awards	2003	"Complicated"	Popular International Music Video by a New Artist	Won	
Channel [V] Thailand Music Video Awards	2005	Herself	Popular International Female Artist	Nominated	
Comet Music Awards	2003	Herself	Newcomer International	Nominated	
Comet Music Awards	2004	Herself	Act International	Won	
Common Sense Media Awards	2004	Herself	Best Musician †	Won	
Danish Music Awards	2003	Herself	Foreign Newcomer of the Year	Won	
Echo Music Prize	2003	Herself	International Newcomer of the Year	Won	
Echo Music Prize	2004	Herself	Best International Rock/Pop Female Artist	Nominated	
Echo Music Prize	2005	Herself	Best International Rock/Pop Female Artist	Nominated	
Echo Music Prize	2008	Herself	Best International Rock/Pop Female Artist	Nominated	
Edison Music Awards	2003	Herself	Best International New Artist/Group	Won	
FiFi Awards	2010	Black Star	Women's Popular Appeal	Nominated	
FiFi Awards	2011	Forbidden Rose	Women's Popular Appeal	Nominated	
GAFFA Awards (Denmark)	2002	Herself	Best Foreign Female Act	Nominated	
GAFFA Awards (Denmark)	2002	Herself	Best Foreign New Act	Won	
GAFFA Awards (Denmark)	2020	Head Above Water	Best International Album	Longlisted	
GAFFA Awards (Denmark)	2020	Herself	Best International Solo Artist	Longlisted	
Glamour Awards	2007	Herself	International Solo Artist of the Year	Nominated	
Grammy Awards	2003	Herself	Best New Artist	Nominated	
Grammy Awards	2003	Let Go	Best Pop Vocal Album	Nominated	
Grammy Awards	2003	"Complicated"	Song of the Year	Nominated	
Grammy Awards	2003	"Complicated"	Best Female Pop Vocal Performance	Nominated	
Grammy Awards	2003	"Sk8er Boi"	Best Female Rock Vocal Performance	Nominated	
Grammy Awards	2004	"I'm with You"	Song of the Year	Nominated	
Grammy Awards	2004	"I'm with You"	Best Female Pop Vocal Performance	Nominated	
Grammy Awards	2004	"Losing Grip"	Best Female Rock Vocal Performance	Nominated	
Hong Kong Top Sales Music Awards	2003	Let Go	Top Ten Best Selling Foreign Albums †	Won	
Hong Kong Top Sales Music Awards	2004	Under My Skin	Top Ten Best Selling Foreign Albums †	Won	
Hong Kong Top Sales Music Awards	2007	The Best Damn Thing	Top Ten Best Selling Foreign Albums †	Won	
Huading Awards	2013	Herself	Best Global Singer	Won	
Hungarian Music Awards	2003	Let Go	Foreign Rock Album of the Year	Nominated	
Hungarian Music Awards	2005	Under My Skin	Foreign Modern Rock Album of the Year	Nominated	
ITA Nickelodeon Kids' Choice Awards	2007	Herself	Best International Artist/Band	Nominated	
ITA Nickelodeon Kids' Choice Awards	2008	Herself	Best Female Singer	Won	
Ivor Novello Awards	2003	"Complicated"	International Hit of the Year	Won	
Japan Gold Disc Awards	2003	Herself	Artist of the Year	Won	
Japan Gold Disc Awards	2003	Herself	New Artist of the Year	Won	
Japan Gold Disc Awards	2003	Let Go	Rock & Pop Album of the Year	Won	
Japan Gold Disc Awards	2005	Under My Skin	Rock & Pop Album of the Year	Won	
Japan Gold Disc Awards	2006	Live at Budokan: Bonez Tour	Music Video of the Year	Won	
Japan Gold Disc Awards	2008	Herself	Artist of the Year	Won	
Japan Gold Disc Awards	2008	The Best Damn Thing	Album of the Year	Won	
Japan Gold Disc Awards	2008	The Best Damn Thing	Best 3 Albums †	Won	
Japan Gold Disc Awards	2008	"Girlfriend"	Mastertone of the Year	Won	
Japan Gold Disc Awards	2008	"Girlfriend"	Single Track of the Year (Mobile)	Won	
Japan Gold Disc Awards	2012	Goodbye Lullaby	Best 3 Albums †	Won	
Japan Gold Disc Awards	2020	Head Above Water	Best 3 Albums †	Won	
Japan Gold Disc Awards	2023	Love Sux	Best 3 Albums †	Won	
Juno Awards	2003	Herself	Songwriter of the Year	Nominated	
Juno Awards	2003	Herself	New Artist of the Year	Won	
Juno Awards	2003	Herself	Juno Fan Choice Award	Nominated	
Juno Awards	2003	Let Go	Album of the Year	Won	
Juno Awards	2003	Let Go	Pop Album of the Year	Won	
Juno Awards	2003	"Complicated"	Single of the Year	Won	
Juno Awards	2004	My World	Music DVD of the Year	Nominated	
Juno Awards	2004	Herself	Juno Fan Choice Award	Nominated	
Juno Awards	2005	Herself	Artist of the Year	Won	
Juno Awards	2005	Herself	Songwriter of the Year	Nominated	
Juno Awards	2005	Herself	Juno Fan Choice Award	Won	
Juno Awards	2005	Under My Skin	Album of the Year	Nominated	
Juno Awards	2005	Under My Skin	Pop Album of the Year	Won	
Juno Awards	2008	Herself	Artist of the Year	Nominated	
Juno Awards	2008	Herself	Songwriter of the Year	Nominated	
Juno Awards	2008	Herself	Juno Fan Choice Award	Nominated	
Juno Awards	2008	The Best Damn Thing	Album of the Year	Nominated	
Juno Awards	2008	"Girlfriend"	Single of the Year	Nominated	
Juno Awards	2012	Herself	Juno Fan Choice Award	Nominated	
Juno Awards	2012	Goodbye Lullaby	Album of the Year	Nominated	
Juno Awards	2012	Goodbye Lullaby	Pop Album of the Year	Nominated	
Juno Awards	2014	Herself	Juno Fan Choice Award	Nominated	
Juno Awards	2015	Avril Lavigne	Pop Album of the Year	Nominated	
Juno Awards	2019	Herself	Juno Fan Choice Award	Won	
Juno Awards	2020	Herself	Juno Fan Choice Award	Won	
Juno Awards	2020	Head Above Water	Pop Album of the Year	Nominated	
Juno Awards	2023	Herself	Artist of the Year	Nominated	
Juno Awards	2023	Herself	Juno Fan Choice Award	Won	
Juno Awards	2023	Love Sux	Album of the Year	Nominated	
Juno Awards	2023	Love Sux	Pop Album of the Year	Nominated	
Juno Awards	2023	"Bite Me"	Single of the Year	Nominated	
KKBox Music Awards	2014	Herself	2013 Best Western Artist	Won	
Los Premios MTV Latinoamérica	2002	Herself	Best New Artist — International	Won	
Los Premios MTV Latinoamérica	2002	Herself	Best Pop Artist — International	Nominated	
Los Premios MTV Latinoamérica	2003	Herself	Best Pop Artist — International	Won	
Los Premios MTV Latinoamérica	2004	Herself	Best Pop Artist — International	Won	
Los Premios MTV Latinoamérica	2007	Herself	Best Pop Artist — International	Won	
Los Premios MTV Latinoamérica	2007	"Girlfriend"	Song of the Year	Won	
Lunas del Auditorio	2003	Herself	Pop in Foreign Language	Nominated	
Lunas del Auditorio	2006	Herself	Pop in Foreign Language	Nominated	
Lunas del Auditorio	2008	Herself	Pop in Foreign Language	Nominated	
Lunas del Auditorio	2014	Herself	Pop in Foreign Language	Nominated	
Meteor Music Awards	2003	Herself	Best International Female	Won	
Meus Prêmios Nick	2003	Herself	Favorite International Artist	Won	
Meus Prêmios Nick	2005	Herself	Favorite International Artist	Won	
MTV Asia Awards	2003	Herself	Favorite Female Artist	Won	
MTV Asia Awards	2003	Herself	Favorite Breakthrough Artist	Won	
MTV Asia Awards	2003	Herself	The Style Award †	Won	
MTV Asia Awards	2005	Herself	Favorite Female Artist	Won	
MTV Asia Awards	2008	Herself	Favorite International Artist in Asia	Nominated	
MTV Asia Awards	2008	"Girlfriend Remix" (feat. Lil Mama)	Best Hook-up	Nominated	
MTV Europe Music Awards	2002	Herself	Best New Act	Nominated	
MTV Europe Music Awards	2004	Herself	Best Female	Nominated	
MTV Europe Music Awards	2004	Herself	Best Pop	Nominated	
MTV Europe Music Awards	2007	Herself	Best Solo	Won	
MTV Europe Music Awards	2007	The Best Damn Thing	Best Album	Nominated	
MTV Europe Music Awards	2007	"Girlfriend"	Most Addictive Track	Won	
MTV Europe Music Awards	2014	Herself	Best Canadian Act	Nominated	
MTV Europe Music Awards	2019	Herself	Best Canadian Act	Nominated	
MTV Europe Music Awards	2022	Herself	Best Canadian Act	Nominated	
MTV Italian Music Awards	2006	Herself	First Lady	Won	
MTV Italian Music Awards	2008	Herself	First Lady	Won	
MTV Italian Music Awards	2008	"Girlfriend"	Best Number One of the Year	Nominated	
MTV Italian Music Awards	2010	Herself	Best International Act	Nominated	
MTV Italian Music Awards	2011	Herself	Best Look	Won	
MTV Italian Music Awards	2011	Herself	Wonder Woman Award	Nominated	
MTV Italian Music Awards	2012	Herself	Best Fan	Nominated	
MTV Italian Music Awards	2012	Herself	Best Look	Nominated	
MTV Italian Music Awards	2014	Herself	Artist Saga	Nominated	
MTV Italian Music Awards	2015	Herself	Artist Saga	Nominated	
MTV Italian Music Awards	2015	Herself	Best Fan	Won	
MTV Italian Music Awards	2016	Herself	Artist Saga	Nominated	
MTV Italian Music Awards	2016	Herself	MTV Award Star	Won	
MTV Italian Music Awards	2017	Herself	Artist Saga	Nominated	
MTV Russia Music Awards	2007	Herself	Best International Act	Won	
MTV Video Music Awards	2002	"Complicated"	Best New Artist in a Video	Won	
MTV Video Music Awards	2003	"I'm with You"	Best Female Video	Nominated	
MTV Video Music Awards	2003	"Sk8er Boi"	Best Pop Video	Nominated	
MTV Video Music Awards	2004	"Don't Tell Me"	Best Pop Video	Nominated	
MTV Video Music Awards	2007	"Girlfriend"	Monster Single of the Year	Nominated	
MTV Video Music Awards	2022	"Grow" (feat. Willow Smith)	Best Alternative	Nominated	
MTV Video Music Awards	2022	"Love It When You Hate Me" (feat. Blackbear)	Best Alternative	Nominated	
MTV Video Music Awards Japan	2003	Let Go	Album of the Year	Nominated	
MTV Video Music Awards Japan	2003	"Complicated"	Video of the Year	Nominated	
MTV Video Music Awards Japan	2003	"Complicated"	Best Female Video	Nominated	
MTV Video Music Awards Japan	2003	"Complicated"	Best New Artist	Won	
MTV Video Music Awards Japan	2005	"My Happy Ending"	Best Female Video	Nominated	
MTV Video Music Awards Japan	2008	The Best Damn Thing	Album of the Year	Nominated	
MTV Video Music Awards Japan	2008	"Girlfriend"	Best Pop Video	Won	
MTV Video Music Awards Japan	2008	"Girlfriend"	Best Karaokee! Song	Nominated	
MTV Video Music Awards Japan	2011	"Alice"	Best Karaokee! Song	Nominated	
MTV Video Music Awards Japan	2011	"Alice"	Best Video From a Film	Won	
MTV Video Music Awards Japan	2014	"Rock N Roll"	Best Karaokee! Song	Nominated	
MTV Video Music Brazil	2003	"Complicated"	Best International Video	Nominated	
MTV Video Music Brazil	2004	"Don't Tell Me"	Best International Video	Nominated	
MTV Video Music Brazil	2005	"He Wasn't"	Best International Video	Nominated	
MTV Video Play Awards	2007	"Girlfriend"	Most Played Music Video of the Year	Platinum	
MTV Video Play Awards	2011	"What the Hell"	Most Played Music Video of the Year	Platinum	
MuchMusic Video Awards	2003	"Sk8er Boi"	Best International Video by a Canadian	Won	
MuchMusic Video Awards	2003	"Sk8er Boi"	People's Choice: Favourite Canadian Artist	Won	
MuchMusic Video Awards	2004	"Don't Tell Me"	Best International Video by a Canadian	Won	
MuchMusic Video Awards	2004	"Don't Tell Me"	People's Choice: Favourite Canadian Artist	Won	
MuchMusic Video Awards	2005	"My Happy Ending"	People's Choice: Favourite Canadian Artist	Nominated	
MuchMusic Video Awards	2007	"Girlfriend"	Best International Video by a Canadian	Won	
MuchMusic Video Awards	2007	"Girlfriend"	People's Choice: Favourite Canadian Artist	Won	
MuchMusic Video Awards	2008	"Girlfriend"	MuchMusic.com Most Watched Video	Nominated	
MuchMusic Video Awards	2008	"When You're Gone"	UR Fave: Artist	Won	
MuchMusic Video Awards	2010	"Alice"	International Video of the Year by a Canadian	Nominated	
MuchMusic Video Awards	2010	"Alice"	UR Fave: Video	Nominated	
MuchMusic Video Awards	2011	"What the Hell"	International Video of the Year by a Canadian	Nominated	
MuchMusic Video Awards	2011	"What the Hell"	UR Fave: Artist	Nominated	
MuchMusic Video Awards	2012	"Smile"	International Video of the Year by a Canadian	Nominated	
MuchMusic Video Awards	2013	"Here's To Never Growing Up"	International Video of the Year by a Canadian	Won	
MuchMusic Video Awards	2014	"Rock N Roll"	International Video of the Year by a Canadian	Nominated	
MuchMusic Video Awards	2014	"Rock N Roll"	Your Fave Artist/Group	Nominated	
Myx Music Awards	2008	"Girlfriend"	Favorite International Video	Nominated	
Nickelodeon Australian Kids' Choice Awards	2007	"Girlfriend"	Fave Song	Nominated	
Nickelodeon Kids' Choice Awards	2003	"Sk8er Boi"	Favorite Song	Won	
Nickelodeon Kids' Choice Awards	2005	Herself	Favorite Female Singer	Won	
Nickelodeon Kids' Choice Awards	2008	"Girlfriend"	Favorite Song	Won	
Nickelodeon Mexico Kids' Choice Awards	2003	Herself	Favorite International Band/Solo	Won	
Nickelodeon Mexico Kids' Choice Awards	2010	"Alice"	Favorite Song	Nominated	
Nickelodeon UK Kids' Choice Awards	2007	Herself	Best Female Singer	Nominated	
Nickelodeon UK Kids' Choice Awards	2007	"Girlfriend"	MTV Hits Best Music Video	Won	
NME Awards	2003	Herself	Best Solo Artist	Nominated	
NME Awards	2003	Herself	Most Sexiest Woman	Won	
NRJ Music Awards	2004	Herself	International Breakthrough of the Year	Nominated	
NRJ Music Awards	2005	Herself	International Female Artist of the Year	Won	
NRJ Music Awards	2008	Herself	International Female Artist of the Year	Won	
People Choice Awards	2005	Herself	Favorite Female Musical Performer	Nominated	
Planeta Awards	2007	Herself	Singer of the Year	Won	
Planeta Awards	2007	"Girlfriend"	Pop/Hip Hop Song of the Year	Nominated	
Planeta Awards	2007	"When You're Gone"	Ballad of the Year	Won	
Planeta Awards	2007	"When You're Gone"	Best Female Vocal Performance	Nominated	
Premios Oye!	2003	Herself	Main English Breakthrough of the Year	Won	
Premios Oye!	2003	Let Go	Main English Female Record	Won	
Premios Oye!	2004	Under My Skin	Main English Record of the Year	Won	
Premios Oye!	2007	The Best Damn Thing	Main English Record of the Year	Nominated	
Premios Oye!	2007	"Girlfriend"	Main English Song of the Year	Nominated	
Radio Disney Music Awards	2002	Herself	Best Female Artist	Won	
Radio Disney Music Awards	2002	Let Go	Best Album	Won	
Radio Disney Music Awards	2002	"Complicated"	Best Song	Won	
Radio Disney Music Awards	2002	"Complicated"	Best Homework Song	Won	
Radio Disney Music Awards	2003	Herself	Best Female Artist	Nominated	
Radio Disney Music Awards	2003	"Sk8er Boi"	Best Song to Air Guitar	Won	
Radio Disney Music Awards	2003	"Sk8er Boi"	Best Video That Rocks	Nominated	
Radio Disney Music Awards	2003	"I'm with You"	Best Song That Makes You Turn Up the Radio	Nominated	
Radio Disney Music Awards	2004	Herself	Best Female Artist	Nominated	
Radio Disney Music Awards	2004	"Don't Tell Me"	Best Song	Nominated	
Radio Disney Music Awards	2004	"My Happy Ending"	Best Song to Air Guitar	Won	
Radio Disney Music Awards	2007	Herself	Best Female Artist	Nominated	
Radio Disney Music Awards	2007	Herself	Best Top 40 Artist	Nominated	
Radio Disney Music Awards	2007	Herself	Most Talked About Artist	Nominated	
Radio Disney Music Awards	2007	"Girlfriend"	Best Song	Nominated	
Radio Disney Music Awards	2007	"Girlfriend"	Best Song to Dance	Won	
Radio Disney Music Awards	2007	"Girlfriend"	Best Song to Sing to an Ex	Nominated	
Radio Disney Music Awards	2007	"Girlfriend"	Best Video That Rocks	Nominated	
Radio Disney Music Awards	2014	"Here's To Never Growing Up"	Best Song to Rock Out to With Your BFF	Nominated	
Radio Disney Music Awards	2019	Herself	Shero Award †	Won	
Radio Music Awards	2003	"I'm with You"	Song of the Year/Top 40 Radio	Nominated	
Radio Music Awards	2003	"I'm with You"	Song of the Year/Modern Adult Contemporary Radio	Nominated	
Radio Music Awards	2003	"Complicated"	Song of the Year/Modern Adult Contemporary Radio	Won	
Radio Music Awards	2003	Herself	Artist of the Year/Modern Adult Contemporary Radio	Nominated	
Radio Music Awards	2003	Herself	Artist of the Year/Top 40 Radio	Nominated	
Radio Music Awards	2005	Herself	Artist of the Year/Adult Hit Radio	Nominated	
RTHK International Pop Poll Awards	2005	Herself	Top Female Artist	Gold	
RTHK International Pop Poll Awards	2005	Under My Skin	The Best Selling English Album †	Won	
RTHK International Pop Poll Awards	2005	"Don't Tell Me"	Super Gold Song †	Won	
RTHK International Pop Poll Awards	2005	"Don't Tell Me"	Top Ten International Gold Songs †	Won	
RTHK International Pop Poll Awards	2008	"Girlfriend"	Top Ten International Gold Songs †	Won	
RTHK International Pop Poll Awards	2014	Avril Lavigne	The Best Selling English Album †	Won	
Satellite Awards	2010	"Alice"	Best Original Song	Nominated	
SOCAN Awards	2003	"Complicated"	International Achievement †	Won	
SOCAN Awards	2003	"Complicated"	Pop/Rock Music Award †	Won	
SOCAN Awards	2003	"Sk8er Boi"	Pop/Rock Music Award †	Won	
SOCAN Awards	2004	"I'm with You"	Pop/Rock Music Award †	Won	
SOCAN Awards	2006	"Breakaway"	Pop/Rock Music Award †	Won	
SOCAN Awards	2008	"Girlfriend"	SOCAN Salutes †	Won	
SOCAN Awards	2008	"Girlfriend"	Pop/Rock Music Award †	Won	
SOCAN Awards	2008	"Keep Holding On"	Pop/Rock Music Award †	Won	
SOCAN Awards	2008	"When You're Gone"	Pop/Rock Music Award †	Won	
Spike Guys Choice Awards	2008	Herself	Sexiest Siren	Nominated	
Teen Choice Awards	2003	Let Go	Choice Music: Album	Nominated	
Teen Choice Awards	2003	"I'm with You"	Choice Music: Love Song	Nominated	
Teen Choice Awards	2003	"Sk8er Boi"	Choice Music: Single	Won	
Teen Choice Awards	2003	Herself	Choice Music: Female Artist	Nominated	
Teen Choice Awards	2003	Herself	Choice Female Fashion Icon	Nominated	
Teen Choice Awards	2004	Herself	Choice Music: Female Artist	Won	
Teen Choice Awards	2004	Herself	Choice Music: Tour	Nominated	
Teen Choice Awards	2004	Herself	Choice Female Fashion Icon	Nominated	
Teen Choice Awards	2005	Herself	Choice Music: Female Artist	Nominated	
Teen Choice Awards	2007	Herself	Choice Summer Music Star	Nominated	
Teen Choice Awards	2007	"Girlfriend"	Choice Music: Single	Won	
TMF Awards (Belgium)	2002	"Complicated"	Best Clip: International	Won	
TMF Awards (Belgium)	2002	Herself	Most Promising: International	Won	
TMF Awards (Belgium)	2007	Herself	Best Female: International	Nominated	
TMF Awards (Belgium)	2008	Herself	Best Female: International	Nominated	
TMF Awards (Belgium)	2008	Herself	Best Pop: International	Nominated	
TMF Awards (Netherlands)	2003	Herself	Best Rock: International	Won	
Total Request Live Awards	2003	Herself	First Lady	Nominated	
V Chart Awards	2014	Herself	Favorite Artist of the Year - Western	Won	
V Chart Awards	2014	Herself	Top Female Artist - Western	Won	
V Chart Awards	2016	Herself	Favorite Artist of the Year - Western	Won	
VH1 Big Awards	2002	Herself	Lolita Ford	Nominated	
VH1 Big Awards	2002	"Complicated"	Can't Get You Out of My Head	Nominated	
Virgin Media Music Awards	2007	Herself	Best International Act	Won	
Virgin Media Music Awards	2007	"Girlfriend"	Best Track	Nominated	
World Music Award	2002	Herself	World's Best Canadian Pop/Rock Artist	Won	
World Music Award	2003	Herself	World's Best Canadian Artist	Won	
World Music Award	2004	Herself	World's Best Pop/Rock Artist	Won	
World Music Award	2004	Herself	World's Best-Selling Canadian Artist	Won	
World Music Award	2007	Herself	World's Best Selling Pop Rock Female Artist	Won	
World Music Award	2007	Herself	World's Best-Selling Canadian Artist	Won	
Zamu Music Awards	2003	Herself	International Artist	Won	
Žebřík Music Awards	2002	Herself	International Female Singer of the Year	Nominated	
Žebřík Music Awards	2002	Herself	International Discovery of the Year	Nominated	
Žebřík Music Awards	2003	Herself	International Female Singer of the Year	Nominated	
Žebřík Music Awards	2004	Herself	International Female Singer of the Year	Nominated	
Žebřík Music Awards	2005	Herself	International Female Singer of the Year	Nominated	
Žebřík Music Awards	2005	Herself	International Personality of the Year	Nominated	
Žebřík Music Awards	2006	Herself	International Female Singer of the Year	Nominated	
Žebřík Music Awards	2007	Herself	International Female Singer of the Year	Won	
Žebřík Music Awards	2007	The Best Damn Thing	International Album of the Year	Nominated	
Žebřík Music Awards	2007	The Best Damn Thing	International Music DVD of the Year	Nominated	
Žebřík Music Awards	2007	"Girlfriend"	International Composition of the Year	Nominated	
Žebřík Music Awards	2007	"Girlfriend"	International Video of the Year	Won	
Žebřík Music Awards	2008	Herself	International Female Singer of the Year	Nominated	
Žebřík Music Awards	2009	Herself	International Female Singer of the Year	Nominated	
Žebřík Music Awards	2023	Herself	Foreign Female Artist of the Year	Nominated	
Žebřík Music Awards	2023	Love Sux	Foreign Album of the Year	Nominated	
Žebřík Music Awards	2023	"I'm a Mess" (feat. Yungblud)	Foreign Video of the Year	Nominated	

== Other accolades ==
=== Guinness World Records ===
Year the record was awarded, record holder, and name of the record
Year	Record holder	World Record	Ref.
2004	Let Go	Youngest Female with a Number One Album in the UK	

=== State honours ===
Country or organization	Year	Award or Honor	Ref(s)
United States of America	2022	Hollywood Walk of Fame	
Canada	2023	Canada's Walk of Fame	
Canada	2024	Order of Canada	

=== Listicles ===
Name of publisher, name of listicle, year(s) listed, and placement result
Publisher	Listicle	Year	Recipient	Result	Ref.
AllMusic	Most Significant Post-grunge Songs of all Time	2012	"He Wasn't"	Longlisted	
AllMusic	Most Significant Post-grunge Songs of all Time	2012	"My Happy Ending"	Longlisted	
AllMusic	Most Significant Pop punk Songs of all Time	2012	"Girlfriend"	Longlisted	
Billboard	The Greatest Pop Star By Year: Rookie of the Year	2002	Herself	Placed	
Billboard	Female With Three Number One Singles from a Debut Album on the Billboard Top 40 Mainstream	2003	Herself	Second	
Billboard	Artists of the Decade	2009	Herself	28th Place	
Billboard	Top Artists of the 21st Century	2025	Herself	47th Place	
Billboard	Top 100 Women Artists of the 21st Century	2025	Herself	19th Place	
Billboard	Best Pop Songs of All Time	2023	"Sk8er Boi"	225th Place	
Billboard	Top Billboard 200 Albums of the 21st Century	2025	Let Go	47th Place	
Entertainment Weekly Magazine	Hottest Debut Album of 2002	2002	Let Go	Placed	
Forbes	Hollywood's Moguls In The Making	2008	Herself	7th Place	
MTV	The Best Superhero-Themed Music Video Ever	2013	"Rock n Roll"	2nd Place	
PopDust	Today's Greatest Pop-Punkers	2013	Herself	1st Place	
Rock and Roll Hall of Fame	Time Pieces in History of Music Recording	2007	Let Go	162nd Place	
Rolling Stone	Readers' Top Albums of the Decade	2009	Let Go	4th Place	
Rolling Stone	Readers' Top Singles of the Decade	2009	"Complicated"	8th Place	
Rolling Stone	50 Best Canadian Musicians Of All Time	2023	Herself	22nd Place	
Spin	The 21 Best Pop-Punk Choruses of the 21st Century	2017	"Sk8er Boi"	5th Place	
Vevo	First Video to reach 100 Million Views Online	2008	"Girlfriend"	Placed	
VH1	The 100 Greatest Women In Music	2012	Herself	84th Place	
VH1	VH1's 100 Sexiest Artists	2013	Herself	71st Place	
