= Young Adult Library Services Association =

U.S. association of librarians, library workers, and library advocates

The Young Adult Library Services Association (YALSA) was a division of the American Library Association from 1957 to 2026. YALSA was a national association of librarians, library workers and advocates whose mission was to expand the capacity of libraries to better serve teens. YALSA administered several awards and sponsored an annual Young Adult Literature Symposium, Teen Read Week, the third week of each October, and Teen Tech Week, the second week of each March. YALSA aimed to expand and strengthen library services for teens through advocacy, research, professional development and events.

On August 31, 2026, YALSA, after nearly seventy years as a division, was dissolved and reunified with the Association for Library Service to Children (ALSC) on September 1, 2026.

== History ==
The organization that is now referred to as the Young Adult Library Services Association began on June 24, 1957, and was called the Young Adult Services Division following a reorganization of the American Library Association. This reorganization resulted in the Association of Young People's Librarians being split into the Children's Library Association and the Young Adult Services Division.

A major responsibility of YASD was the evaluation and selection of materials for young adults, with the most active YASD committee being the book selection committee. YASD also advocated for library services for youth by sending delegates to both the 1960 and 1971 White House Conferences on Youth. By the 1970s YASD was growing stronger with its own office and staff and in 1979 it was given division representation on the ALA council.

YASD's involvement in book selection also continued, with genre-specific book committees being formed in 1988. The name change to the Young Adult Services Association occurred in 1992, and brought greater recognition to the organization, as well as a new image, logo and a new mission and vision statement. The re-branding of YASD as YALSA in the 1990s also brought with it an electronic and online presence, as well as new programs such as Teen Read Week. Additionally, YALSA began awarding the Printz and Alex Awards. YALSA has also been awarded the World Book Goal award twice by the ALA for its work serving young adults in public libraries.

Starting in 1994 presidents of YALSA also began identifying themes that would reflect their terms of service, such as, "Youth Participation Revisited" and "Developing a National Leadership Agenda for Library Service to Young Adults". The official journal of YALSA is called Young Adult Library Services, and it provides articles of current interest, book reviews, professional literature and serves as the official record of the organization.

In 2026 it was decided to dissolve YALSA and reunify it with the Association for Library Service to Children (ALSC).

== Awards ==
- The Alex Awards were named for twentieth-century American librarian Margaret "Alex" Edwards. They are awarded annually to ten books written for adults that have special appeal to young adults. The Alex Awards were first given in 1998.
- The Edwards Award was named for twentieth-century American librarian Margaret A. Edwards. It is awarded annually to an author and a specific body of their work, for a significant and lasting contribution to young adult literature. The Edwards Award was first given in 1988.
- The Morris Award was named for twentieth-century American publisher William C. Morris. The Morris Award was first given in 2009.
- The Odyssey Award was named in honor of the Homer's eighth century BC epic poem, Odyssey, to remind us of the ancient roots of storytelling, while living in our modern world. The Odyssey Award, awarded to the best audio book production for young adults, is jointly given and administered by YALSA and the Association for Library Service to Children (ALSC), another division of the ALA. It is sponsored by Booklist magazine, a publication of the ALA. The Odyssey Award was first given in 2008.
- The Printz Award was named for twentieth-century American librarian Michael L. Printz. It is sponsored by Booklist magazine, a publication of the ALA. It is awarded annually to the book that exemplifies literary excellence in young adult literature. The Printz Award was first given in 2000
- The YALSA Award for Excellence in Nonfiction for Young Adults honors the best nonfiction book published for young adults (ages 12–18) during the previous publishing year. The award was first given in 2010.

== See also ==
- Young Adult Library Services, magazine published by YALSA
- Association for Library Service to Children (ALSC)
