= AG Hair =

Canadian hair product company

AG Care
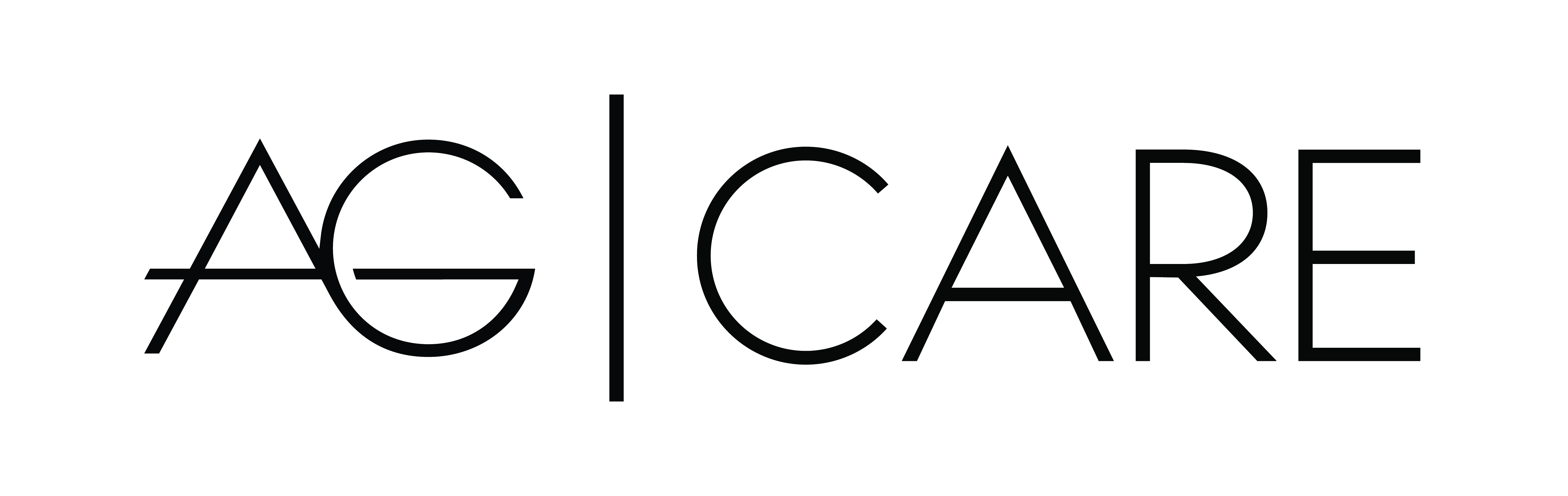
- Type: Private
- Industry: Hair care and cosmetics
- Founded: 1989 in Vancouver, British Columbia, Canada
- Headquarters: Coquitlam, British Columbia, Canada
- Area served: Worldwide
- Key people: Lotte Davis, co-founder; John Davis, co-founder
- Website: ag.care

AG Care (AG Hair LTD) is a Canadian beauty company based in British Columbia, Canada. It is the largest independent manufacturer of professional hair-care products in Canada.

AG Care formulates and manufactures professional hair care products that are vegan, cruelty-free and made without drying sulfates, gluten, DEA, parabens, PABA or DMDMH.

== History ==
AG Care was founded in 1989, by Lotte Davis, a South African-born graphic designer and her husband John Davis, a hairdresser from Liverpool, in their North Vancouver basement. The Davises began to formulate and manufacture their own professional hair care products, which they sold to salons directly beginning in 1990. In 2001, AG Care products began selling to salons in the United States. In 2022, AG Care launched new sustainable packaging made from aluminum and PCR bottles, and eliminated large-format plastic bottles in favour of refill pouches, a shift towards sustainability and care for the environment. Today, AG Care is available across Canada, the US and Australia in salons and retailers Ulta Beauty, Chatters, COBIA Beauty, Tommy Gun's Original Barbershop, and Price Attack.

In 2008, Lotte Davis founded One Girl Can Society to help African girls obtain an education by building schools. One Girl Can provides secondary, vocational, and university scholarships to eligible girls in Africa. AG Care contributes annually through employee volunteering to in-kind and financial support to help educate girls and women in Africa. Since its founding, proceeds from AG Care product sales have raised over $2.2 million and built five schools in Sub-Saharan Africa. In 2015, AG Care launched limited-edition packaging of its hairspray Firewall Argan Flat Iron Spray to raise funds for One Girl Can. 50 cents of each bottle sold goes to the foundation.

In October 2008, John and Lotte Davis (parents of actress Mackenzie Davis) received the Pacific Ernst & Young Entrepreneur of the Year Award for business-to-business products and services for AG Care. That year AG Care was named one of the best companies to work for in British Columbia by BC Business Magazine.

AG Care was featured in Business Vancouver's list of top 100 biggest manufacturers in Metro Vancouver in 2016. Since 2017, Deloitte named AG Care one of the best managed companies in Canada.
