= Young Adult Library Services =

US magazine

- Categories: Libraries, Librarianship, Library science
- Frequency: Quarterly
- Circulation: 5,000
- Founded: 1942
- Company: Young Adult Library Services Association
- Country: United States
- Based in: Chicago
- Language: English
- Website: www.ala.org/yalsa/young-adult-library-services
- ISSN: 1541-4302
- OCLC: 648971934

Young Adult Library Services (ISSN 1541-4302) is a quarterly magazine published by the Young Adult Library Services Association (YALSA). It supersedes the Journal of Youth Services, which was published together with the Association for Library Service to Children until 2002. The magazine serves as a mode of continuing education for librarians working with young adult populations (ages 12–18).

The content of the magazine includes current news in the field, showcasing the best practices, providing news from related fields, spotlighting significant events of YALSA, and providing in depth reviews of professional literature. The fall issue contains award announcements, speeches by award-winning authors, and background information on books. The journal publishes articles about teen habits, literacy, and interests. Additionally, it serves as mode of communication for members of the association and as a record for the organization.

== History ==
Young Adult Library Services started as Top of the News in 1942. Top of the News was published by the Division for Children and Young Peoples, which had been created in 1941. The Division for Children and Young Peoples was succeeded by the Children's Services Division and the Young Adult Services Division in 1957. From then on Top of the News was published jointly by both divisions.

The name of the journal changed to Journal for Youth Services (JOYS) in 1987 to adequately reflect the contents and interests of the membership. In 1993, with the restructuring of the Young Adult Services Division into the Young Adult Library Services Association, JOYS was restructured as well. With an aim of creating a more informed readership, JOYS began publishing speeches from programs from YALSA and the Children's Services Division, which had been renamed Association for Library Service to Children (ALSC) in 1977.

They also increased the pool of referees from 33 to 50. In 2002 this magazine was split in two: Young Adult Library Services and Children and Libraries. Young Adult Library Services has been the recipient of the 2008, 2009, 2010, 2011, 2012, and 2016 Apex Awards of Excellence for a magazine or journal over 32 pages.
