= List of songs performed by Avril Lavigne =

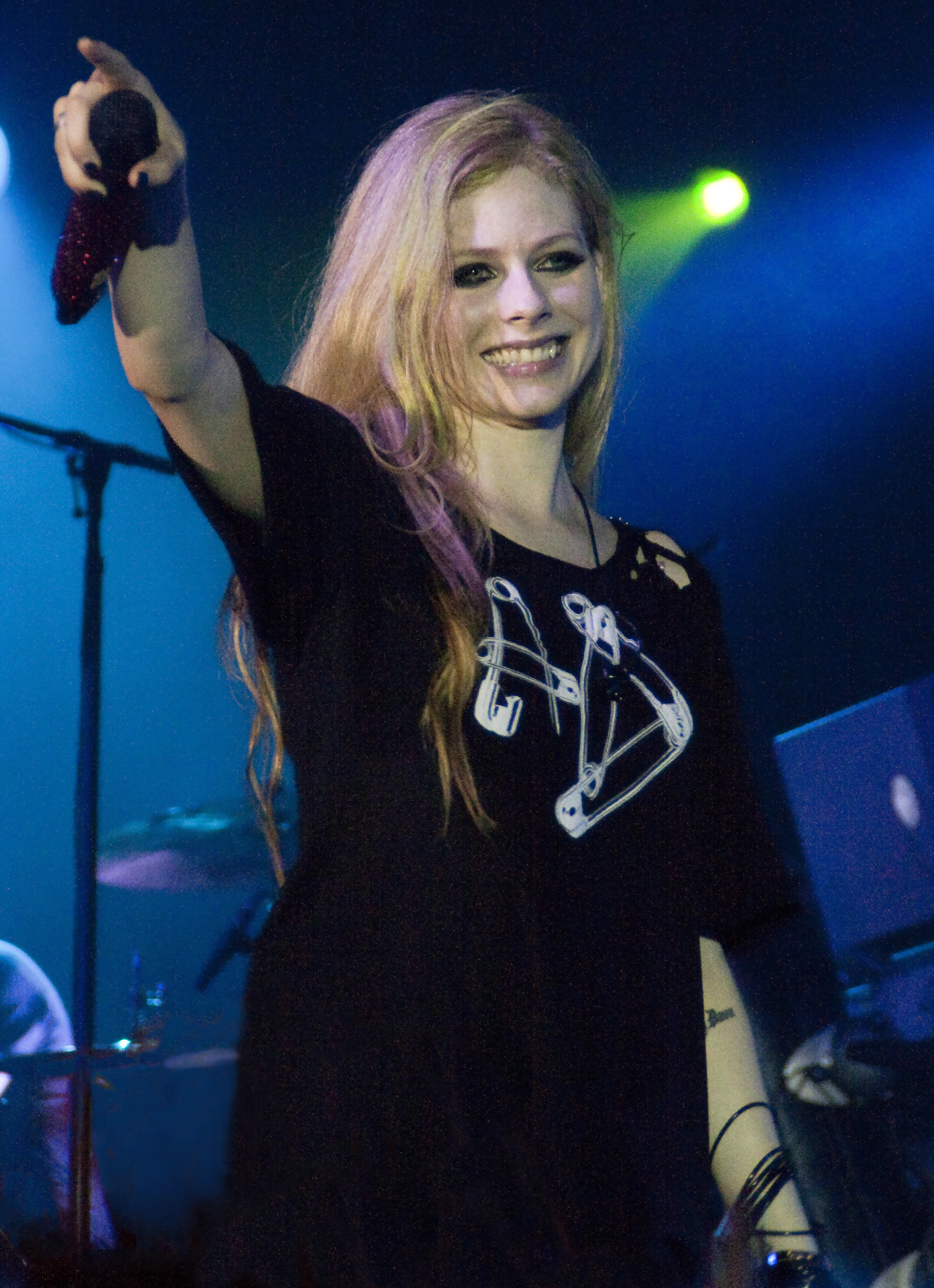
Lavigne performing in Indonesia on the Black Star Tour in 2011

The list of songs written and performed by Canadian singer-songwriter Avril Lavigne comprises original songs recorded for her studio albums, cover versions of songs by other artists performed by Lavigne, and original songs written by Lavigne that were recorded and released by other artists. Since her professional music career began in 2002, Lavigne has worked with a number of songwriters and producers.

After signing a record contract with Arista in November 2000 at age 16, Lavigne spent several months in New York working on songs for her debut album, Let Go, with several songwriters, including Sabelle Breer, Curt Frasca and Peter Zizzo. Unhappy with the direction the album was taking, Lavigne moved to Los Angeles in May 2001 and made a major breakthrough when she began working with American pop music writing and record producer trio The Matrix. Together, the four produced "Complicated", which would become Lavigne's first single and gain her international recognition, as well as two of the album's other singles, "Sk8er Boi" and "I'm with You". Overall, Lavigne produced six songs with The Matrix, five of which were included on the final album. She also worked with several other songwriters and producers, including Clif Magness.

For her second album, Under My Skin, released in 2004, Lavigne made no plans to work with professional writers. Instead, she wrote most of the album's songs with Canadian singer-songwriter Chantal Kreviazuk, with whom she had become friends the previous summer. The two spent nearly three weeks writing in the warehouse of Kreviazuk's husband, Raine Maida, the lead vocalist and songwriter for Our Lady Peace. Because Lavigne had no experience in production, Maida produced five of the album's songs. Lavigne also worked with two other producers: Don Gilmore, who worked on two tracks, and Butch Walker, who worked on three. Along with Kreviazuk, Lavigne wrote three songs with her former guitarist, Evan Taubenfeld, and one with Ben Moody.

Lavigne began recording her third album, The Best Damn Thing, in August 2006. She teamed with songwriter and producer Dr. Luke. Together they wrote the album's debut single, "Girlfriend", a fast-paced, pop-punk song. Lavigne also worked with her then-husband and Sum 41 singer Deryck Whibley, as well as with Butch Walker, who worked on two of the album's singles, and Evan Taubenfeld, who co-wrote four of the album's twelve songs.

Goodbye Lullaby, Lavigne's fourth studio album, was released in 2011. Lavigne began recording the album in 2008 at her home studio. The album's first track, "Black Star", was originally written by Lavigne as a jingle for the television commercial promoting her fragrance of the same name. She later expanded the song to include it on the album. In all, Lavigne wrote half of the album's fourteen tracks on her own. She also worked with Max Martin and Shellback, who co-wrote all three of the album's singles. She again wrote several songs with Evan Taubenfeld. Though he and Lavigne had been divorced in 2009, Deryck Whibley produced seven tracks on the album.

In addition to her original studio songs, Lavigne has also covered songs by other artists, both in live performances and on studio releases. Her first was "Knockin' On Heaven's Door" by Bob Dylan, which she first performed in 2003. She has also covered several songs on each of her four world tours, including Green Day's "Basket Case", Blink-182's "All the Small Things", and Coldplay's "Fix You". Lavigne has also written several songs that she gave to other artists, most notably "Breakaway", which was recorded by Kelly Clarkson and released on her second album of the same name.

== Original songs ==
Avril Lavigne's original songs include those written and recorded by Lavigne and released on a studio album or on a single album. Lavigne has released seven studio albums and 32 singles.

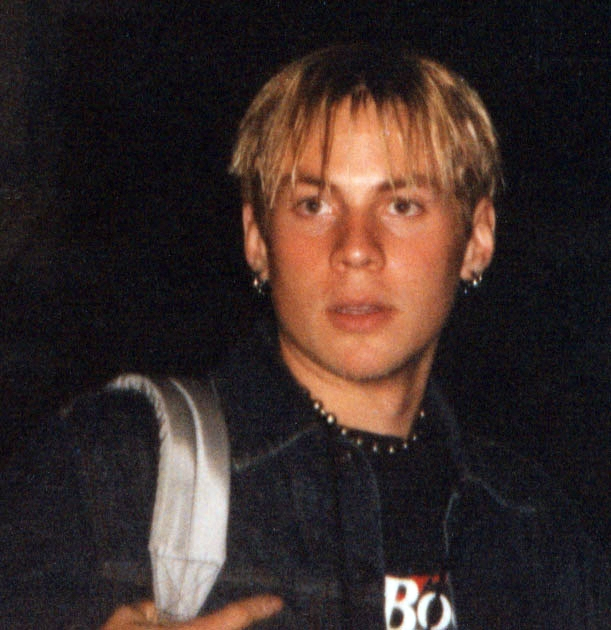
Lavigne has written numerous songs with her former guitarist, Evan Taubenfeld, including "Don't Tell Me" and "Hot". He also appears as a vocalist on "Push".

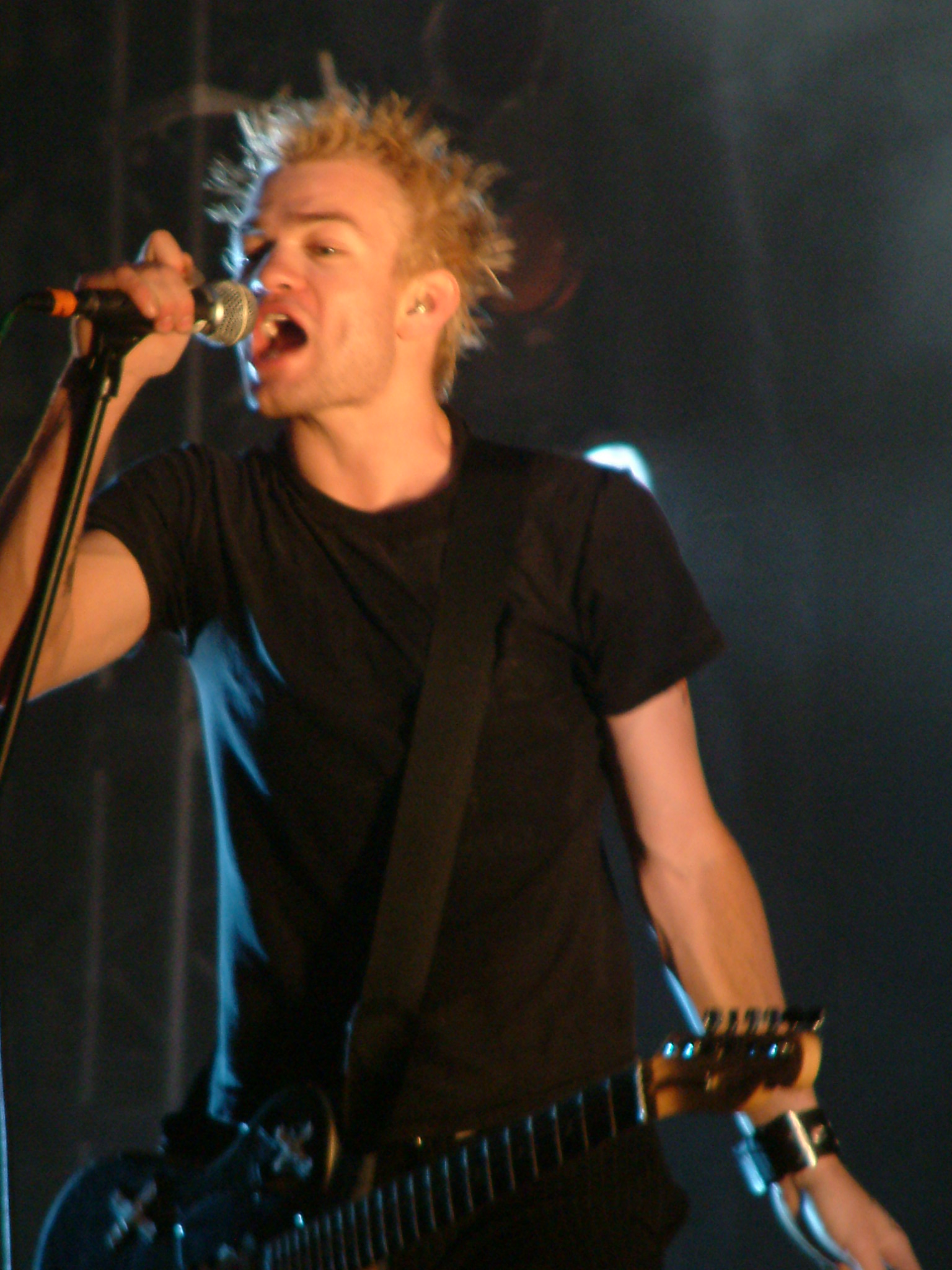
Deryck Whibley, Sum 41 member and Lavigne's ex-husband, played electric guitar and bass guitar on "The Best Damn Thing", "One of Those Girls", and "Contagious" while the two were married. He also produced six tracks on Goodbye Lullaby after their divorce in 2009.

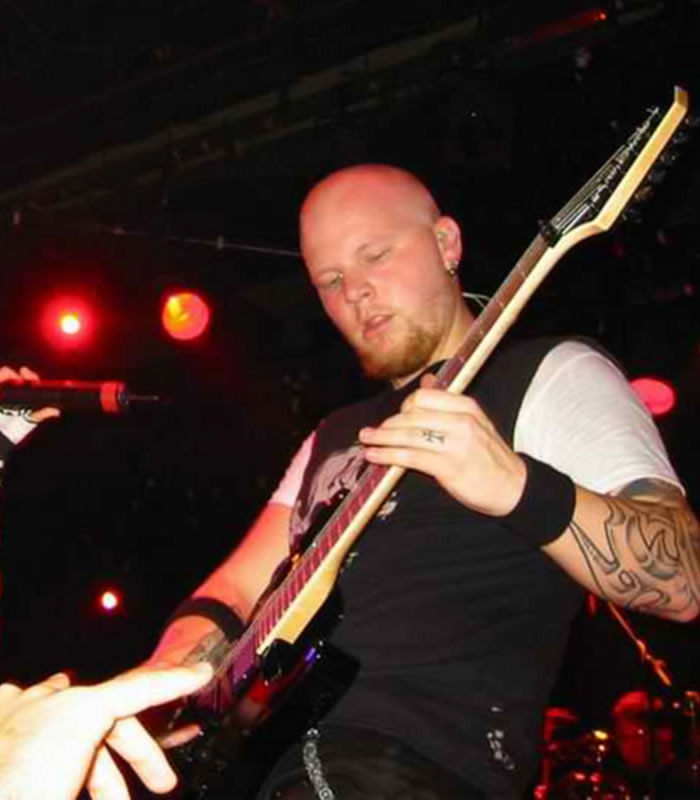
Ben Moody co-wrote "Nobody's Home", the third single from Under My Skin.

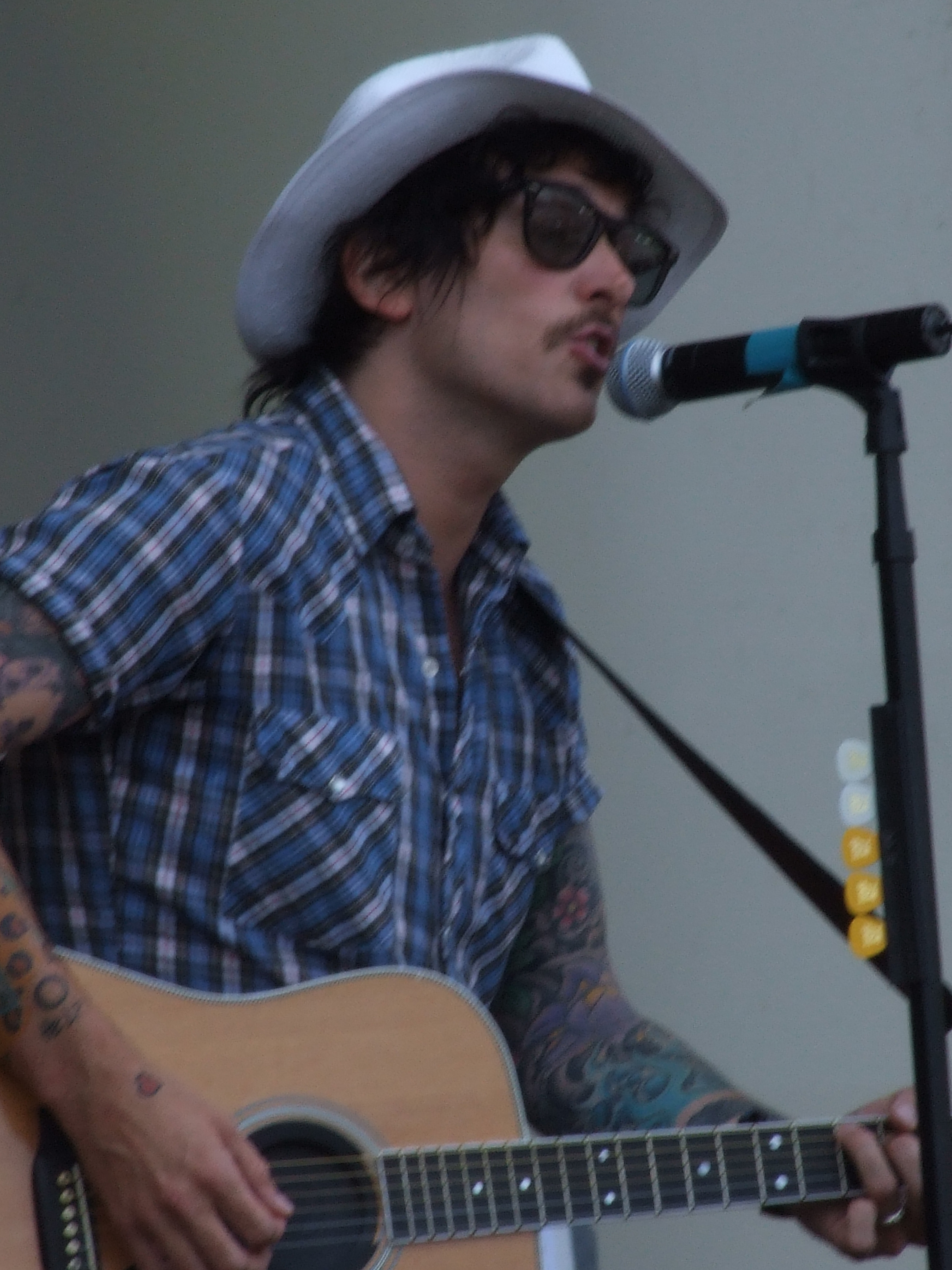
Butch Walker worked with Lavigne on "My Happy Ending", one of her most successful singles. He also co-wrote "The Best Damn Thing" and "When You're Gone".

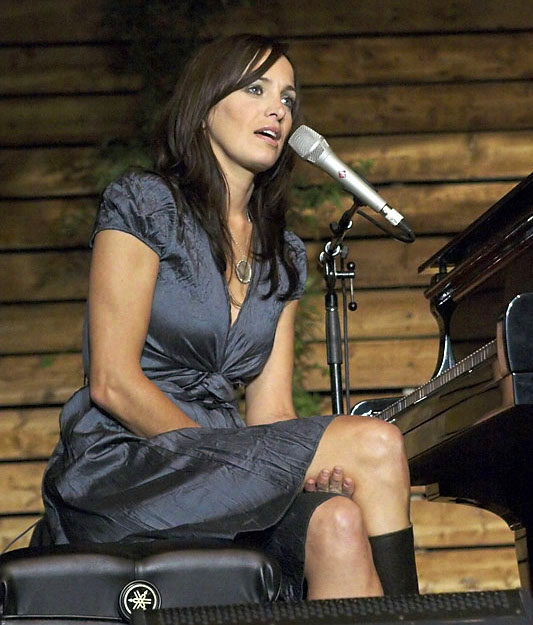
Chantal Kreviazuk worked with Lavigne on much of Under My Skin. She co-wrote "Forgotten", "He Wasn't", "How Does It Feel", "Slipped Away", "Together", and "Who Knows". Her husband, Raine Maida, produced several tracks on the album.

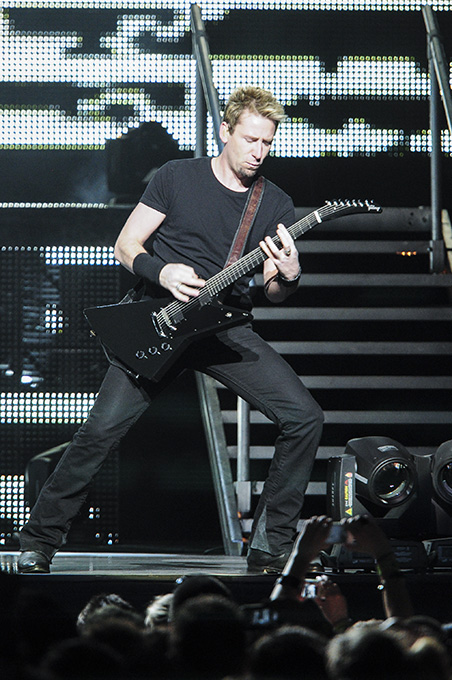
Lavigne worked with Chad Kroeger of Nickelback on much of her fifth studio album, including its lead single, "Here's To Never Growing Up".

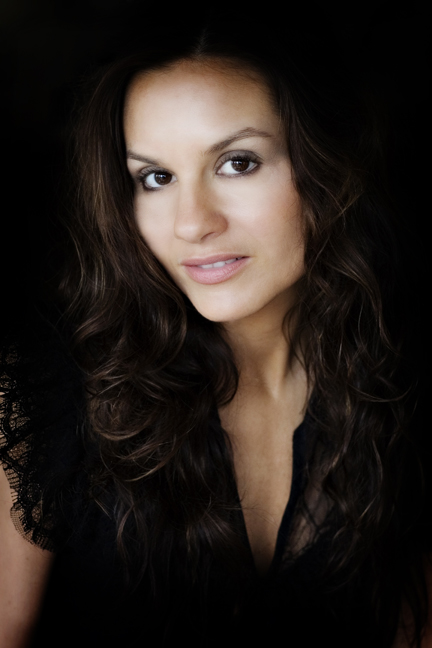
American singer-songwriter Kara DioGuardi co-wrote "Runaway" with Lavigne and Dr. Luke.

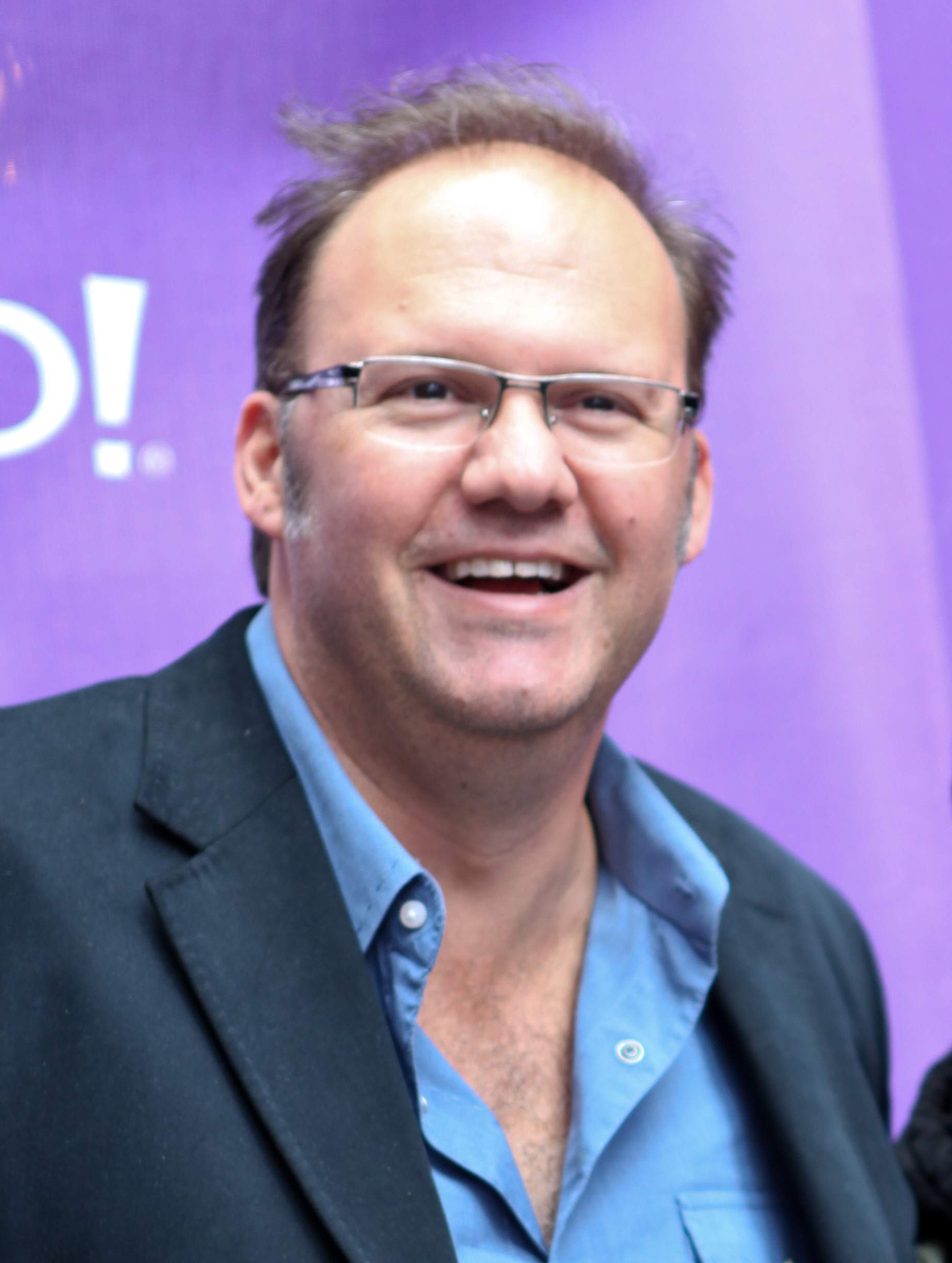
Rob Cavallo produced the song "Innocence" on The Best Damn Thing

Key
†	Denotes a single release
‡	Denotes a B-side

Song	Featured performer(s)	Writer(s)	Original release	Year	Ref.
"4 Real"	—N/a	Avril Lavigne	Goodbye Lullaby	2011	
"17"	—N/a	Avril Lavigne; Jacob Kasher; Martin Johnson	Avril Lavigne	2013	
"Alice" †	—N/a	Avril Lavigne	Almost Alice	2010	
"All I Wanted"	Mark Hoppus	Avril Lavigne; John Feldmann; Derek "Mod Sun" Smith; Mark Hoppus	Love Sux	2022	
"Alone"‡	—N/a	Avril Lavigne; Dr. Luke	Girlfriend	2007	
"Anything but Ordinary"	—N/a	Avril Lavigne; The Matrix	Let Go	2002	
"Avalanche"	—N/a	Avril Lavigne; John Feldmann; Derek "Mod Sun" Smith	Love Sux	2022	
"Bad Girl"	Marilyn Manson	Avril Lavigne; David Hodges; Chad Kroeger	Avril Lavigne	2013	
"Bigger Wow"	—N/a	Avril Lavigne; Jon Levine	Head Above Water	2019	
"Birdie"	—N/a	Avril Lavigne; J.R. Rotem	Head Above Water	2019	
"Bitchin' Summer"	—N/a	Avril Lavigne; Matt Squire; Jacob Kasher; David Hodges; Chad Kroeger	Avril Lavigne	2013	
"Bite Me" †	—N/a	Avril Lavigne; John Feldmann; Derek "Mod Sun" Smith; Omer Fedi; Marshmello	Love Sux	2021	
"Black Star"	—N/a	Avril Lavigne	Goodbye Lullaby	2011	
"Bois Lie"	Machine Gun Kelly	Avril Lavigne; John Feldmann; Derek "Mod Sun" Smith; Colson Baker	Love Sux	2022	
"Break of a Heartache"	—N/a	Avril Lavigne; John Feldmann; Derek "Mod Sun" Smith	Love Sux	2022	
"Breakaway"	—N/a	Avril Lavigne; Bridget Benenate; Matthew Gerrard	Let Go (20th anniversary edition)	2022	
"Cannonball"	—N/a	Avril Lavigne; John Feldmann; Derek "Mod Sun" Smith	Love Sux	2022	
"Complicated" †	—N/a	Avril Lavigne; The Matrix	Let Go	2002	
"Contagious"	—N/a	Avril Lavigne; Evan Taubenfeld	The Best Damn Thing	2007	
"Crush"	—N/a	Avril Lavigne; Zane Carney	Head Above Water	2019	
"Dare to Love Me"	—N/a	Avril Lavigne; John Feldmann; Derek "Mod Sun" Smith	Love Sux	2022	
"Darlin"	—N/a	Avril Lavigne	Goodbye Lullaby	2011	
"Déjà Vu"	—N/a	Avril Lavigne; John Feldmann; Derek "Mod Sun" Smith	Love Sux	2022	
"Don't Tell Me" †	—N/a	Avril Lavigne; Evan Taubenfeld	Under My Skin	2004	
"Dumb Blonde" †	Nicki Minaj	Avril Lavigne; Bonnie McKee; Mitch Allan; Onika Maraj	Head Above Water	2019	
"Everybody Hurts"	—N/a	Avril Lavigne; Evan Taubenfeld	Goodbye Lullaby	2011	
"Everything Back but You"	—N/a	Avril Lavigne; Butch Walker	The Best Damn Thing	2007	
"F.U."	—N/a	Avril Lavigne; Travis Barker; Nick Long	Love Sux	2022	
"Falling Down"	—N/a	Avril Lavigne; The Matrix	Sweet Home Alabama	2002	
"Falling Fast"	—N/a	Avril Lavigne	Avril Lavigne	2013	
"Fall to Pieces"	—N/a	Avril Lavigne; Raine Maida	Under My Skin	2004	
"Fly"†	—N/a	Avril Lavigne; Chad Kroeger; David Hodges	Single only	2015	
"Forgotten"	—N/a	Avril Lavigne; Chantal Kreviazuk	Under My Skin	2004	
"Freak Out"	—N/a	Avril Lavigne; Evan Taubenfeld; Matt Brann	Under My Skin	2004	
"Get Over It"‡	—N/a	Avril Lavigne; The Matrix	Sk8er Boi	2002	
"Girlfriend" †	—N/a	Avril Lavigne; Dr. Luke	The Best Damn Thing	2007	
"Give You What You Like" †	—N/a	Avril Lavigne; David Hodges; Chad Kroeger	Avril Lavigne	2013	
"Goddess"	—N/a	Avril Lavigne	Head Above Water	2019	
"Goodbye"	—N/a	Avril Lavigne	Goodbye Lullaby	2011	
"He Wasn't" †	—N/a	Avril Lavigne; Chantal Kreviazuk	Under My Skin	2004	
"Head Above Water" †	—N/a	Avril Lavigne; Stephan Moccio; Travis Clark	Head Above Water	2018	
"Hello Heartache"	—N/a	Avril Lavigne; David Hodges	Avril Lavigne	2013	
"Hello Kitty" †	—N/a	Avril Lavigne; David Hodges; Martin Johnson; Chad Kroeger	Avril Lavigne	2013	
"Here's to Never Growing Up" †	—N/a	Avril Lavigne; David Hodges; Martin Johnson; Chad Kroeger; Jacob Kasher	Avril Lavigne	2013	
"Hot" †	—N/a	Avril Lavigne; Evan Taubenfeld	The Best Damn Thing	2007	
"How Does It Feel"	—N/a	Avril Lavigne; Chantal Kreviazuk	Under My Skin	2004	
"Hush Hush"	—N/a	Avril Lavigne; David Hodges	Avril Lavigne	2013	
"I Always Get What I Want"	—N/a	Avril Lavigne; Clif Magness	Under My Skin	2004	
"I Can Do Better"	—N/a	Avril Lavigne; Dr. Luke	The Best Damn Thing	2007	
"I Don't Give"‡	—N/a	Avril Lavigne; The Matrix	Complicated	2002	
"I Don't Have to Try"	—N/a	Avril Lavigne; Dr. Luke	The Best Damn Thing	2007	
"I Fell in Love with the Devil" †	—N/a	Avril Lavigne	Head Above Water	2019	
"I Love You"	—N/a	Avril Lavigne; Max Martin; Shellback	Goodbye Lullaby	2011	
"I Will Be"	—N/a	Avril Lavigne; Max Martin; Dr. Luke	The Best Damn Thing	2007	
"I'm a Mess" †	Yungblud	Avril Lavigne; Dominic Harrison; John Feldmann; Travis Barker	Love Sux (deluxe edition)	2022	
"I'm with You" †	—N/a	Avril Lavigne; The Matrix	Let Go	2002	
"Innocence"	—N/a	Avril Lavigne; Evan Taubenfeld	The Best Damn Thing	2007	
"It Was in Me"	—N/a	Avril Lavigne; Lauren Christy	Head Above Water	2019	
"Keep Holding On" †	—N/a	Avril Lavigne; Dr. Luke	Eragon: Music from the Motion Picture	2006	
"Kiss Me Like the World Is Ending"	—N/a	Avril Lavigne; John Feldmann; Derek "Mod Sun" Smith	Love Sux	2022	
"Let Me Go" †	Chad Kroeger	Avril Lavigne; David Hodges; Chad Kroeger	Avril Lavigne	2013	
"Losing Grip" †	—N/a	Avril Lavigne; Clif Magness	Let Go	2002	
"Love It When You Hate Me" †	Blackbear	Avril Lavigne; John Feldmann; Derek "Mod Sun" Smith; Matthew Musto	Love Sux	2022	
"Love Me Insane"	—N/a	Avril Lavigne; Jon Levine	Head Above Water	2019	
"Love Sux"	—N/a	Avril Lavigne; John Feldmann; Derek "Mod Sun" Smith	Love Sux	2022	
"Make Up"	—N/a	Avril Lavigne; The Matrix	Let Go (20th anniversary edition)	2022	
"Mercury in Retrograde"	—N/a	Avril Lavigne	Love Sux (deluxe edition)	2022	
"Mobile" †	—N/a	Avril Lavigne; Clif Magness	Let Go	2002	
"My Happy Ending" †	—N/a	Avril Lavigne; Butch Walker	Under My Skin	2004	
"My World"	—N/a	Avril Lavigne; Clif Magness	Let Go	2002	
"Naked"	—N/a	Avril Lavigne; Curtis Frasca; Sabelle Breer	Let Go	2002	
"Nobody's Fool"	—N/a	Avril Lavigne; Peter Zizzo	Let Go	2002	
"Nobody's Home" †	—N/a	Avril Lavigne; Ben Moody	Under My Skin	2004	
"Not Enough"	—N/a	Avril Lavigne; Evan Taubenfeld	Goodbye Lullaby	2011	
"One of Those Girls"	—N/a	Avril Lavigne; Evan Taubenfeld	The Best Damn Thing	2007	
"Pity Party"	—N/a	Avril Lavigne	Love Sux (deluxe edition)	2022	
"Push"	Evan Taubenfeld	Avril Lavigne; Evan Taubenfeld	Goodbye Lullaby	2011	
"Remember When"	—N/a	Avril Lavigne	Goodbye Lullaby	2011	
"Rock n Roll" †	—N/a	Avril Lavigne; Rickard Göransson; David Hodges; Jacob Kasher; Chad Kroeger; Peter Svensson	Avril Lavigne	2013	
"Runaway"	—N/a	Avril Lavigne; Dr. Luke; Kara DioGuardi	The Best Damn Thing	2007	
"Sippin' on Sunshine"	—N/a	Avril Lavigne; Chad Kroeger; Jacob Kasher; David Hodges; Martin Johnson	Avril Lavigne	2013	
"Sk8er Boi" †	—N/a	Avril Lavigne; The Matrix	Let Go	2002	
"Slipped Away"	—N/a	Avril Lavigne; Chantal Kreviazuk	Under My Skin	2004	
"Smile" †	—N/a	Avril Lavigne; Max Martin; Shellback	Goodbye Lullaby	2011	
"Souvenir"	—N/a	Avril Lavigne; Jon Levine	Head Above Water	2019	
"Stop Standing There"	—N/a	Avril Lavigne	Goodbye Lullaby	2011	
"Take It"‡	—N/a	Avril Lavigne; Clif Magness	My Happy Ending	2004	
"Take Me Away"‡	—N/a	Avril Lavigne; Evan Taubenfeld	Don't Tell Me	2004	
"Tell Me It's Over" †	—N/a	Avril Lavigne; Ryan Cabrera; Johan Carlsson; Melissa Bel; Justin Gray	Head Above Water	2018	
"The Best Damn Thing" †	—N/a	Avril Lavigne; Butch Walker	The Best Damn Thing	2007	
"Things I'll Never Say"	—N/a	Avril Lavigne; The Matrix	Let Go	2002	
"Together"	—N/a	Avril Lavigne; Chantal Kreviazuk	Under My Skin	2004	
"Tomorrow"	—N/a	Avril Lavigne; Curtis Frasca; Sabelle Breer	Let Go	2002	
"Too Much to Ask"	—N/a	Avril Lavigne; Clif Magness	Let Go	2002	
"Unwanted"	—N/a	Avril Lavigne; Clif Magness	Let Go	2002	
"Warrior"	—N/a	Avril Lavigne; Travis Clark; Chad Kroeger	Head Above Water	2019	
"What the Hell" †	—N/a	Avril Lavigne; Max Martin; Shellback	Goodbye Lullaby	2011	
"When You're Gone" †	—N/a	Avril Lavigne; Butch Walker	The Best Damn Thing	2007	
"Who Knows"	—N/a	Avril Lavigne; Chantal Kreviazuk	Under My Skin	2004	
"Why"‡	—N/a	Avril Lavigne; Peter Zizzo	Complicated	2002	
"Wish You Were Here" †	—N/a	Avril Lavigne; Max Martin; Shellback	Goodbye Lullaby	2011	
"You Ain't Seen Nothin' Yet"	—N/a	Avril Lavigne	Avril Lavigne	2013	
"Young & Dumb" †	Simple Plan	Avril Lavigne; Chuck Comeau; John Feldmann; Pierre Bouvier	Single only	2025	

== Unreleased original songs ==
A number of songs written, recorded, and performed by Avril Lavigne have never been released. Many of these have been registered with professional music and copyright bodies, including the American Society of Composers, Authors and Publishers (ASCAP), Broadcast Music Incorporated (BMI), and the Harry Fox Agency. Several have also been acknowledged and discussed by Lavigne in interviews, or by other sources.

Key
Denotes a leaked song

Song	Featured performer(s)	Writers(s)	Associated album(s)	Ref.
"A Ring from Tiffany's"	—N/a	Unknown	Eighth studio album	
"Afraid I Might Find Another Guy"	—N/a	Avril Lavigne; Evan Taubenfeld	Under My Skin	
"Aftershock"	—N/a	Unknown	Eighth studio album	
"All You Will Never Know"	—N/a	Avril Lavigne; Terence Dover	Let Go	
"Anesthesia"	—N/a	Unknown	Eighth studio album	
"Bad Behavior"	—N/a	Unknown	Eighth studio album	
"Bandboi"	—N/a	Unknown	Eighth studio album	
"Black & White"	—N/a	Unknown	Head Above Water	
"Blood"	—N/a	Unknown	Eighth studio album	
"Boy At The Rock Show"	—N/a	Unknown	Eighth studio album	
"Break It So Good"	Lauren Christy	Avril Lavigne; Lauren Christy	Head Above Water	
"Bright"	—N/a	Avril Lavigne; J.R Rotem; Raja Kumari; Justin Tranter	Head Above Water	
"Burn Out"	—N/a	Unknown	Love Sux	
"By the Light of the Moon"	—N/a	Avril Lavigne; The Matrix	Let Go	
"Californyeah!"	Mod Sun	Unknown	Love Sux	
"Can't Stop Thinking of You"	—N/a	Avril Lavigne	Unknown	
"Cest La Vie"	—N/a	Unknown	Love Sux	
"Cherry Pop"	—N/a	Unknown	Eighth studio album	
"Classy Bitch"	—N/a	Unknown	Eighth studio album	
"Close"	—N/a	Unknown	Eighth studio album	
"Dancing With a Hurricane"	—N/a	Unknown	Love Sux	
"Dead To Me"	—N/a	Unknown	Eighth studio album	
"Dick"	—N/a	Unknown	Eighth studio album	
"Don't Fuck This Up"	—N/a	Avril Lavigne; Chad Kroeger; Jacob Kasher; Johan Carlsson	Avril Lavigne	
"Don't Mind Me"	—N/a	Avril Lavigne; Peter Zizzo	Let Go	
"Don't Stop"	—N/a	Avril Lavigne; Ketil Johnson; Sebastian Kornelius; Lauren Christy; Taylor Parks	Head Above Water	
"Echo"	—N/a	Avril Lavigne; David Hodges; Chad Kroeger	Avril Lavigne	
"Eternally"	—N/a	Unknown	Love Sux	
"Face to Face"	—N/a	Avril Lavigne; The Matrix	Let Go	
"Fall Back"	—N/a	Avril Lavigne; Ben Moody	Under My Skin	
"Fall into the Sky"	—N/a	Avril Lavigne; Rick Nowels	Under My Skin	
"Falling into History"	—N/a	Peter Zizzo; Jessica Sheely	Let Go	
"Fine"	—N/a	Unknown	Goodbye Lullaby	
"Fishnet"	—N/a	Unknown	Eighth studio album	
"Gone"	—N/a	Avril Lavigne; Evan Taubenfeld	Goodbye Lullaby	
"Got Me Bad"	—N/a	Avril Lavigne; John Rzeznik	The Best Damn Thing	
"Headache"	—N/a	Avril Lavigne; Evan Taubenfeld	Under My Skin	
"Headset"	—N/a	Peter Zizzo	Let Go	
"Hellelujah"	—N/a	Unknown	Love Sux	
"Hold onto You"	—N/a	Avril Lavigne; Evan Taubenfeld	Under My Skin	
"I Want What I Want"	—N/a	Unknown	Head Above Water	
"If I Said I Loved You"	Chad Kroeger	Unknown	Avril Lavigne	
"In Touch"	—N/a	Christoph Andersson; Lauren Christy; Bebe Rexha; Talay Riley	Head Above Water	
"It's Not OK"	—N/a	Avril Lavigne; David Hodges; Chad Kroeger	Avril Lavigne	
"It's Not Over"	—N/a	Avril Lavigne; Ben Moody	Under My Skin	
"Joker"	—N/a	Unknown	Love Sux	
"Kick and Shout"	—N/a	Avril Lavigne; Evan Taubenfeld	Under My Skin	
"Leave Here a Little While"	—N/a	Avril Lavigne; Evan Taubenfeld	Under My Skin	
"Let Go"	—N/a	Unknown	Let Go	
"Let's Get Weird"	—N/a	Unknown	Head Above Water	
"Liar"	—N/a	Unknown	Eighth studio album	
"Lights Out"	—N/a	Avril Lavigne; JR Rotem; Nick Ruth; Carah Faye Charnow	Head Above Water	
"Love Like a Child"	—N/a	Peter Zizzo	Let Go	
"Lucky Ones"	—N/a	Avril Lavigne; Isley Juber; JR Rotem; Lauren Christy; Jason Evigan	Head Above Water	
"Me, Myself & I"	—N/a	Unknown	Love Sux	
"Miss Me"	—N/a	Unknown	Eighth studio album	
"Next Time"	—N/a	Avril Lavigne; Sabelle Breer; Curtis Frasca	Let Go	
"Not Gonna Run"	—N/a	Avril Lavigne; Evan Taubenfeld	Under My Skin	
"Not the Only One"	—N/a	Avril Lavigne; Sabelle Breer; Curtis Frasca	Let Go	
"Once and for Real"	—N/a	Avril Lavigne; Terence Dover	Let Go	
"One Of Us"	GAYLE	Unknown	Eighth studio album	
"Playette"	—N/a	Unknown	Eighth studio album	
"Pretty Ugly"	—N/a	Unknown	Love Sux	
"Priceless"	—N/a	Avril Lavigne; Evan Taubenfeld	Under My Skin	
"Psychopath"	—N/a	Unknown	Eighth studio album	
"Rapstar"	—N/a	Unknown	Eighth studio album	
"Reason"	—N/a	Unknown	Eighth studio album	
"Rock Boyfriend"	Marshmello	Unknown	Love Sux	
"Running from Yourself"	—N/a	Avril Lavigne; Butch Walker	The Best Damn Thing	
"Secret"	—N/a	Avril Lavigne; David Hodges; Chad Kroeger	Avril Lavigne	
"Seeing Red"	YUNGBLUD	Unknown	Love Sux	
"Show Me How"	—N/a	Avril Lavigne; Evan Taubenfeld	Under My Skin	
"Shut Up"	—N/a	Unknown	Love Sux	
"Signs"	—N/a	Unknown	Eighth studio album	
"Sitting Here (Have No Friends)"	—N/a	Avril Lavigne; Evan Taubenfeld	Under My Skin	
"So Cruel (You're A Jerk)"	—N/a	Unknown	Eighth studio album	
"Stars"	—N/a	Unknown	Eighth studio album	
"Stay (Be the One)"	—N/a	Avril Lavigne; Peter Zizzo	Let Go	
"Stay"	—N/a	Avril Lavigne; Devin Bronson	The Best Damn Thing	
"Stranger"	—N/a	Unknown	Eighth studio album	
"Take Me Away"	—N/a	Avril Lavigne; The Matrix	Let Go	
"Take My Breath"	—N/a	Unknown	Love Sux	
"Teenage Nightmare"	—N/a	Unknown	Love Sux	
"Temple of Life"	—N/a	Avril Lavigne	Let Go	
"That Kinda Guy"	—N/a	Avril Lavigne; Sabelle Breer; Curtis Frasca	Let Go	
"This Must Be Love"	—N/a	Avril Lavigne; David Hodges; Chad Kroeger	Avril Lavigne	
"This One's For You"	—N/a	Avril Lavigne; David Hodges; Chad Kroeger	Avril Lavigne	
"Too Fast Too Live"	—N/a	Unknown	Love Sux	
"Too Many Times"	—N/a	Avril Lavigne; Evan Taubenfeld	Under My Skin	
"Twist of Fate"	—N/a	Avril Lavigne; Brian Howes; Kara Dioguardi	The Best Damn Thing	
"Two Rivers"	—N/a	Avril Lavigne	Let Go	
"Understand Me"	—N/a	Avril Lavigne; Evan Taubenfeld	Under My Skin	
"What Would You Be for Me"	—N/a	Avril Lavigne; Evan Taubenfeld	Under My Skin	
"When Will This Be Over"	—N/a	Avril Lavigne; Brian Howes; Kara Dioguardi	The Best Damn Thing	
"Wide Open"	—N/a	Avril Lavigne; J.R Rotem; Justin Tranter; Raja Kumari	Head Above Water	
"Won't Let You Go"	—N/a	Avril Lavigne; Diane Warren	The Best Damn Thing	
"Would You Wait"	—N/a	Unknown	Eighth studio album	
"You Are The One That I Want"	—N/a	Unknown	Eighth studio album	
"You Got Me"	—N/a	Avril Lavigne; Brian Howes; Kara Dioguardi	The Best Damn Thing	

== Cover songs and featured performances ==
Avril Lavigne has covered a number of songs during her career. Her first was a cover of Bob Dylan's "Knockin' On Heaven's Door", which she performed live at promotional appearances in early 2003 and on her Try To Shut Me Up Tour later that year. She has included cover songs on the set list of each of her four world tours, and has also sung several songs with their original performers, notably: "Iris" with Goo Goo Dolls frontman Johnny Rzeznik in 2004, "Ironic" with Alanis Morissette in 2005, and "Love Is a Battlefield" with Pat Benatar in 2011. Lavigne has also performed as a featured artist.

Because Lavigne has performed several covers many times, the year listed for each is the year in which she first performed or released it.

Song	Original Artist(s)	Year	Notes	Ref.
"77"	Billy Idol	2025	Recorded with Billy Idol and released as a single.	
"Adia"	Sarah McLachlan	2007	Performed live with McLachlan at a Unite for Children, Unite Against AIDS benefit concert in Montreal in 2007 and solo at The Roxy Theatre later that year. A studio version of the cover was released on Lavigne's official MySpace page in 2008.	
"Airplanes"	B.o.B ft. Hayley Williams	2011	Chorus performed live at shows on the Black Star Tour as an intro to "My Happy Ending".	`
"All the Small Things"	Blink-182	2005	Performed live at shows on the Bonez Tour.	
"American Idiot"	Green Day	2005	Performed live at shows on the Bonez Tour.	`
"Baby, It's Cold Outside"	Frank Loesser	2017	Studio cover performed with Jonny Blu.	
"Bad Reputation"	Joan Jett	2008	Studio cover played at shows on The Best Damn Tour in 2008 and released on Lavigne's album Goodbye Lullaby in 2011.	
"Basket Case"	Green Day	2003	Performed live at shows on the Try To Shut Me Up Tour.	
"The Beautiful People"	Marilyn Manson	2014	Performed live at shows on the Avril Lavigne On Tour.	
"Best Years of Our Lives"	Evan Taubenfeld	2011	Recorded with Taubenfeld and released as a single. Lavigne and Taubenfeld also performed the song as a duet live at shows on the Canadian leg of The Black Star Tour.	
"Bulletproof"	Nate Smith	2024	Recorded with Nate Smith and released as a single.	
"Chop Suey!"	System of a Down	2002	Performed live at the London Astoria.	
"Eyes Wide Shut"	Illenium	2023	Collaboration with Travis Barker, released as part of Illenium's self-titled fifth studio album.	
"Fake as Hell"	All Time Low	2023	Recorded with All Time Low and released as a single.	
"Fix You"	Coldplay	2011	Performed live at shows on the Black Star Tour.	
"Flames"	Mod Sun	2021	Recorded with Mod Sun and released as a single.	
"Fuel"	Metallica	2003	Performed live on "MTV Icon: Metallica".	
"Get Over Me"	Nick Carter	2015	Musical collaboration on All American album.	
"Grow"	Willow Smith	2021	Also featuring Travis Barker. Included in Willow's fourth album Lately I Feel Everything.	
"Hello"	Adele	2022	Recorded and released as a Spotify single with an acoustic version of "Love Sux".	
"Here in Your Bedroom"	Goldfinger	2022	Collaboration from the deluxe edition of the album Never Look Back.	
"Hey Ya!"	OutKast	2004	Performed live at the Wachovia Spectrum arena in Philadelphia on the Bonez Tour.	
"How You Remind Me"	Nickelback	2012	Recorded for the One Piece Film Z film soundtrack.	
"Imagine"	John Lennon	2007	Released on the compilation album Instant Karma.	
"In Too Deep"	Sum 41	2008	Performed live with Deryck Whibley in Nagoya, Japan on The Best Damn Tour.	
"Iris"	Goo Goo Dolls	2004	Performed live with Goo Goo Dolls frontman Johnny Rzeznik at Fashion Rocks.	
"Ironic"	Alanis Morissette	2005	Performed live with Morissette at the House of Blues.	
"Kiss Me"	Sixpence None the Richer	–	–	–
"Knockin' on Heaven's Door"	Bob Dylan	2003	First performed live in early 2003 at promotional appearances and was included on the set list of the Try To Shut Me Up Tour. A music video for the cover was also released in 2003. A studio version was included on the bonus CD released with the My World DVD.	
"Listen"	One Ok Rock	2017	Musical collaboration on Ambitions Japanese album.	
"Love Is a Battlefield"	Pat Benatar	2011	Performed live with Benatar on The Oprah Winfrey Show.	
"Love Revolution"	Lenny Kravitz	2008	Recorded with Plain White T's, The Red Jumpsuit Apparatus and Vanessa Carlton for a Kohl's television commercial.	
"Mickey"	Toni Basil	2008	Performed live at shows on The Best Damn Tour.	
"Near to the Heart of God"	Cleland Boyd McAfee	1994	Performed at age 10 at a church Christmas concert in Napanee.	
"O Holy Night"	–	2004	Recorded with Chantal Kreviazuk for the compilation album A Winter's Night: The Best of Nettwerk Christmas Albums.	
"Pumped Up Kicks"	Foster the People	2012	Performed live at Stadium Merdeka in Kuala Lumpur, Malaysia, on The Black Star Tour.	
"The Scientist"	Coldplay	2007	Performed live on Jo Whiley's Live Lounge radio show. The performance was released on Radio 1's Live Lounge – Volume 2.	
"Smells Like Teen Spirit"	Nirvana	2005	Performed live at shows on the Bonez Tour.	
"Song 2"	Blur	2004	Performed live at shows on the Bonez Tour in 2004 and again at shows on The Avril Lavigne Tour in 2014.	
"SpongeBob SquarePants Theme"	Painty The Pirate and Kids	2004	Recorded for The SpongeBob SquarePants Movie soundtrack.	
"Tik Tok"	Kesha	2011	Performed live on Jo Whiley's Live Lounge radio show. The performance was released on Radio 1's Live Lounge – Volume 6.	
"Wavin' Flag"	K'naan	2010	Recorded with a supergroup of Canadian artists (credited as Young Artists for Haiti) as a charity single to aid relief efforts following the 2010 Haiti earthquake.	
"We Are Family"	Sister Sledge	2011	Performed live with Stevie Nicks, Sheryl Crow, Joan Jett, Pat Benatar, Miley Cyrus, and Salt-n-Pepa on The Oprah Winfrey Show.	
"What Made You Say That"	Shania Twain	1997	Performed live with Shania Twain in Ottawa at age 13 after winning a local radio station contest.	
"Wings Clipped"	Grey	2017	Also featuring Anthony Green. Included in Grey's debut EP Chameleon.	

== Original songs performed by other artists ==
Lavigne has written several songs that were later recorded and released by other artists. The most notable of these is "Breakaway", which Lavigne wrote with Bridget Benenate and Matthew Gerrard for her debut album, Let Go. Lavigne ultimately decided against including the song because she felt it did not suit the album and sent the track to Kelly Clarkson, who recorded it in 2004 and included it on her second album. Lavigne's version of "I Will Be" was released on several editions of her third album, The Best Damn Thing, before it was given to Leona Lewis, who recorded a version for her own album.

The song "Daydream" was originally intended for Lavigne, but she offered it to Demi Lovato, who did not accept the offer but did perform it on her "Warm Up" Tour. The song later appeared on the album Sparks Fly by Miranda Cosgrove.

Song	Performer(s)	Writer(s)	Album	Year	Ref.
"Breakaway"	Kelly Clarkson	Avril Lavigne; Matthew Gerrard; Bridget Benenate	Breakaway	2004	
"Falling into History"	Brie Larson	Peter Zizzo; Jessica Sheely	Finally Out of P.E.	2005	
"I Will Be"	Leona Lewis	Avril Lavigne; Dr. Luke; Max Martin	Spirit	2009	
"All Because of You"	PUFFY	Avril Lavigne; Butch Walker	Bring It!	2009	
"I Don't Wanna"	PUFFY	Avril Lavigne; Butch Walker	Bring It!	2009	
"Daydream"	Miranda Cosgrove	Avril Lavigne; Chantal Kreviazuk	Sparks Fly	2010	
"Dancing Crazy"	Miranda Cosgrove	Avril Lavigne; Max Martin; Shellback	High Maintenance	2011	

== See also ==
- Avril Lavigne discography
