= We Are Warriors =

Single by Avril Lavigne
- Released: April 24, 2020
- Studio: Home Recordings (Los Angeles, CA) (re-recorded version)
- Genre: Pop rock
- Length: 3:46
- Label: BMG
- Songwriters: Avril Lavigne; Chad Kroeger; Travis Clark
- Producer: Avril Lavigne

Avril Lavigne singles chronology
"I Fell in Love with the Devil" (2019)	"We Are Warriors" (2020)	"Flames" (2021)

Music video
- "We Are Warriors" on YouTube

"We Are Warriors" is a song by Canadian singer Avril Lavigne released on April 24, 2020, for digital download by the BMG Rights Management. A re-recording of the final track—originally titled "Warrior"—from her sixth studio album Head Above Water (2019), Lavigne released the song as a charity single to support Project HOPE during the COVID-19 pandemic. It is her final release for BMG before signing to Travis Barker's label DTA Records and Elektra Records.

== Background ==
The original song, titled "Warrior", was released as the closing track of Head Above Water, and was described by Lavigne as "one of the first songs I wrote for the album after 'Head Above Water.' They are both about the health battle I continue to fight every day," adding, "I hope my songs can help you find strength if you need it..."

In April 2020, Lavigne announced an upcoming project in relation to the COVID-19 pandemic, in order to raise money for Project HOPE, an organisation "keeping doctors and medical staff safe all over the world". On 21 April, this was announced as the new single "We Are Warriors", to be released on 24 April. Along with amended vocals, "We Are Warriors" contains additional violin recorded by Lindsey Stirling.

== Music video ==
The black and white video was released on May 1, 2020, and it showed clips of medical professionals on the front lines intercut with video submissions from fans who filmed themselves holding their signs and shoutouts. In addition, the video also contained footage from the Head Above Water Tour. Lavigne used an iPhone to self-film her own scenes from her home.

== Live performances ==
Lavigne performed the song throughout May and June 2020 on several livestreams from her home to promote it. The livestreams were broadcast on her Instagram profile, YouTube channels and Facebook pages of events in support of victims and frontline workers of the pandemic. The performances were widely praised by the public due to her vocal delivery. Lavigne performed the song on The Tonight Show Starring Jimmy Fallon on June 11, 2020. On June 19, 2020 Lavigne performed the song on Live with Kelly and Ryan.

== Charts ==
Chart performance for "We Are Warriors"
Chart (2020)	Peak position
Canada (Hot Canadian Digital Songs)	23
France Singles Sales Chart (SNEP)	109
UK Singles Downloads (Official Charts)	100
US Digital Song Sales (Billboard)	24

== Release history ==
Release formats for "We Are Warriors"
Region	Date	Format	Label	Ref.
Various	April 24, 2020	Digital download; streaming	BMG	
