= 2019 Radio Disney Music Awards =

Annual US music awards ceremony

ARDYs: A Radio Disney Music Celebration
- Date: June 16, 2019
- Location: CBS Studio Center; Los Angeles, California
- Hosted by: Sofia Carson

Highlights
- Most awards: BTS and Avril Lavigne (1 each)
- Website: http://radio.disney.com/radio-disney-music-awards

Television/radio coverage
- Network: Radio Disney; Disney Channel
- Runtime: 75 minutes
- Viewership: 1.2 million

The 2019 Radio Disney Music Awards (rebranded as ARDYs: A Radio Disney Music Celebration) were held on June 16, 2019, in Los Angeles, California at the CBS Studio Center. It was broadcast on Disney Channel, DisneyNow and Radio Disney at 8:00 p.m. (EDT). The event was hosted by actress and singer Sofia Carson. It was the final edition of the award before Radio Disney was shut down in April 2021. No awards ceremony was held in 2020 due to the COVID-19 pandemic, although a pre-recorded "ARDYs Summer Playlist" special aired on Disney Channel that year.

== Performances ==
Performer(s)	Song
Avril Lavigne	"Complicated" "Sk8er Boi" "Head Above Water" "Dumb Blonde"
Jonas Brothers	"Cool"
Andy Grammer	"Don't Give Up on Me"
Tori Kelly	"Part of Your World"
Gabby Barrett	"The Climb" "I Hope"
Meg Donnelly; Fetty Wap	"Smile" "With U"
Lovelytheband	"These Are My Friends"
JD McCrary; Shahadi Wright Joseph	"I Just Can't Wait to Be King" (from The Lion King)
Steve Aoki	"Mic Drop" "Waste It On Me" "Just Hold On"
Sofia Carson	"Hey Look Ma, I Made It" "The Middle" "Me!" "Boy with Luv" "Old Town Road"

== Awards ==
Unlike previous years, there was no competitive categories for this year's show. However they were some special awards.

- Global Phenom Award: BTS
- Hero Award: Avril Lavigne
