= I Fell in Love with the Devil =

2019 single by Avril Lavigne

Single by Avril Lavigne

from the album Head Above Water
- Released: June 28, 2019
- Genre: Baroque pop; pop rock; gothic pop
- Length: 4:15; 4:38 (video version)
- Label: BMG
- Songwriter: Avril Lavigne
- Producers: Chris Baseford; Avril Lavigne

Avril Lavigne singles chronology
| "Dumb Blonde" (2019) | "I Fell in Love with the Devil" (2019) | "We Are Warriors" (2020) |

Music video
- "I Fell In Love With the Devil" on YouTube

"I Fell in Love with the Devil" is a song by Canadian singer-songwriter Avril Lavigne and is the third track from her sixth studio album, Head Above Water. It was written by Lavigne and produced by Lavigne and Chris Basford. The song is about a toxic relationship she maintained while suffering from Lyme disease. It was released as the fourth and final single from the album on June 28, 2019.

== Background and release ==
On February 7, Avril wrote about the song: "Sometimes your heart conflicts with your head and leads you into situations that you know aren’t right and then once you're there, it's very difficult to get out. I also produced this song with Chris Basford." "I Fell in Love with the Devil" is about being in a toxic relationship and was announced as the fourth single and officially the second single from the album on June 7, 2019.

== Critical reception ==
In a review of Head Above Water, Arielle Gordon of Pitchfork said "Unfortunately, many of the statements she makes are, by contrast, stale and uninspired. Even in its strongest moments, there is nothing revelatory in the lyrics, which tend to run out of steam. The worst offender might be 'I Fell in Love with the Devil', which recounts the story of a wayward lover with metaphors that seem plucked from a LiveJournal entry". Spin's Zoe Camp was also unfavorable in her review, stating that Lavigne took a "technically slack (read: bored-sounding) stab at soul on 'I Fell in Love with the Devil'" and offered a "not-hot take on an abusive relationship". Alexandra Pollard of The Independent was more positive in her review of the song, claiming "Lavigne's voice reaches new heights too–particularly on 'I Fell in Love with the Devil', an ominous, tightly crafted rumination on toxic relationships". Rolling Stone's Emily Zemler labelled it an "emotive anthem" and a "heartbreak-tinged number", and went on to claim that "['I Fell in Love with the Devil'] is a much more emotionally-driven track than her previous singles, 'Head Above Water' and 'Dumb Blonde'".

== Music video ==
A music video for the song was directed by Elliott Lester, who previously directed "Head Above Water", and it premiered on July 15, 2019. Lavigne has been sharing teaser photos of the video shoot to promote the song which later caused the accusations of her being anti-religious by using religious images to promote the song. Some scenes were shot at the Golden Oak Ranch in Newhall, California. The video version of the song features elements from both the album version and radio edit while a portion of the bridge was inserted at the beginning. It features Lavigne driving a hearse and transporting her coffin. Later, she is seen in a dark forest wearing goth-inspired ensemble, clutching a silver cross and interspersed with scenes of her playing a piano adorned with branches. Zane Carney, who played the baritone guitar in the song in addition to contributing on a couple fellow Head Above Water tracks including guitar work on "Birdy", and "Crush" he also co-wrote, plays Lavigne's love interest Lucifer.

== Live performances ==
Lavigne performed the song on The Late Late Show with James Corden on April 30, 2019. Avril Lavigne performed the song on her Head Above Water Tour.

== Controversy ==
After Lavigne posted promo art of her in the woods wearing black and holding a crucifix, some people posted angry comments on Instagram for perceiving the song to be anti-religious. Lavigne explained that the song – which she penned herself – is a depiction of toxic relationships: "I wrote 'I Fell in Love with the Devil' as a constant reminder to myself that some of the darkest people in this world can be disguised as angels," she wrote in an Instagram post. "Please allow my song to be your reminder to not let someone else's demons take you down. I am now going to break this fucking cycle, bury all the toxic relationships and things people have done to me in the past, present, and future."

== Track listing ==
- Digital download
1. "I Fell in Love with the Devil" (radio edit) – 3:38

== Credits and personnel ==
- Avril Lavigne – lead vocals, writer, producer
- Chris Baseford – producer
- Stephan Moccio – piano
- Zane Carney – baritone guitar

== Charts ==
Chart performance for "I Fell in Love with the Devil"
| Chart (2019) | Peak position |
|---|---|
| China Airplay/FL (Billboard) | 9 |

== Certifications ==
| Region | Certification | Certified units/sales |
|---|---|---|
| Brazil (Pro-Música Brasil) | Gold | 20,000^{‡} |
^{‡} Sales+streaming figures based on certification alone.

== Release history ==
Release dates and formats for "I Fell in Love with the Devil"
| Region | Date | Format | Label | Ref. |
|---|---|---|---|---|
| Various | June 28, 2019 | Digital download; streaming | BMG | |
| Italy | July 12, 2019 | Radio airplay | BMG | |
| United States | July 29, 2019 | Hot adult contemporary radio | BMG | |

== See also ==
- Avril Lavigne discography
- List of songs performed by Avril Lavigne
