= Filip Jančík =

- Born: June 23, 1992 (age 33); Poprad, Slovakia
- Occupations: Violinist; Performing artist; Music producer
- Years active: 2010–present
- Known for: Violin covers of popular music and movie soundtracks
- Spouse: Lucia Supeková (m. 2025)
- Musical career
- Genres: Rock; Pop; Classical
- Instrument: Violin
- Website: filipjancik.com

Filip Jančík (born June 23, 1992) is a Slovak violinist, performing artist and music producer. His musical style combines classical and modern genres and he is known for performing covers of various TV and movie soundtracks as well as popular songs.

== Life and career ==
Jančík was born in Poprad, Slovakia on June 23, 1992. He started to attend music school and to play the violin at the age of 6 and throughout the years he received tutoring from several renowned professors. He moved to Vienna, Austria at the age of 17 to pursue further music studies. A year later he decided to focus on the combination of classical music with contemporary genres and he started touring Europe with his production. He has since performed in many countries, including Austria, Sweden, USA, Russia, Kuwait, Finland, Singapore, Belgium, Germany, Denmark, Slovakia and more.

At the age of 22, he was invited to record the Avril Lavigne song Fly, for which he composed the violin parts, and performed it with her live at the opening ceremony of the 2015 Special Olympics World Summer Games. He also performed as a featured guest at Karel Gott's concert in 2018 and he collaborated with David Koller, Loreen and Lillie McCloud. In 2018 he toured his home country Slovakia and performed his renditions of movie soundtracks. He returned for a second tour in 2021.

In December 2023 he was invited to take part in the Bilibili New Year's Eve Gala, a show produced by Bilibili, a Chinese online video platform. He performed the main theme from the Pirates of The Caribbean soundtrack together with Erhu player Eliott Tordo. The gala was released on December 31, 2023 and within 24 hours of publication, it surpassed 100 million views.

He does not employ the services of any agency, rather he organizes and promotes his concerts on his own. He also arranges and produces the music and prepares the dramaturgy for the concerts himself.

== Personal life ==
As of 2021, he resides in Vienna, Austria. He has been in a relationship with Slovak endurance rider Lucia Supeková since 2018 and they got engaged during his concert on September 14, 2021. They got married on July 7, 2025. As a child he used to play tennis as well, but ultimately decided to focus on playing the violin.
