= Head Above Water Tour =

2019 concert tour by Avril Lavigne

Head Above Water World Tour
- Continental tour by Avril Lavigne
- Promotional poster for the tour
- Location: North America
- Associated album: Head Above Water
- Start date: September 14, 2019
- End date: October 11, 2019
- Legs: 1
- No. of shows: 15
- Supporting act: Jagwar Twin

Avril Lavigne concert chronology
- The Avril Lavigne Tour (2013–2014); Head Above Water Tour (2019); Love Sux Tour (2022–2023)

The Head Above Water World Tour was the sixth concert tour by Canadian singer-songwriter Avril Lavigne. Launched in support of her sixth studio album, Head Above Water (2019), the tour began on September 14, 2019 in Seattle and ended on October 11, 2019 in Bensalem. Initially scheduled to end mid-2020 and early 2021 with a total of 43 concerts, all concerts in Asia and European legs were postponed and eventually cancelled due to the global COVID-19 pandemic. Many international tour dates were moved to the Love Sux Tour in 2022.

== Background ==
The tour was announced by Lavigne on her social media on June 24, 2019. She also announced that a portion of the proceeds from every ticket sold on the tour will be donated to The Avril Lavigne Foundation to raise awareness and fund treatment for those in need. Due to the high demand, extra concerts were added in London, Milan and Tokyo. The concert in Vienna was moved to Wiener Stadthalle, due to high demand in the country. The shows in Italy and Switzerland also had venues upgraded due to the demand. Tickets for Berlin and Cologne shows were sold out three months in advance.

== Set list ==
This set list is representative of the show on September 14, 2019, in Seattle. It is not representative of all concerts for the duration of the tour.

1. "Head Above Water"
2. "My Happy Ending"
3. "Here's to Never Growing Up"
4. "What the Hell"
5. "Complicated"
6. "It Was in Me"
7. "Keep Holding On"
8. "Don't Tell Me"
9. "When You're Gone"
10. "Hello Kitty"
11. "Girlfriend"
12. "Dumb Blonde"
13. "He Wasn't"
14. "Sk8er Boi"

Encore

15. "I Fell in Love with the Devil"
16. "I'm with You"

=== Notes ===
- In Toronto, Lavigne performed "Sk8er Boi" with Michael Clifford of 5 Seconds of Summer.

== Tour dates ==
List of North American concerts
Date	City	Country	Venue	Supporting act
September 14, 2019	Seattle	United States	Paramount Theatre	Jagwar Twin
September 15, 2019	Portland	United States	Keller Auditorium	Jagwar Twin
September 17, 2019	Oakland	United States	Fox Oakland Theatre	Jagwar Twin
September 18, 2019	Los Angeles	United States	Greek Theatre	Jagwar Twin
September 21, 2019	Denver	United States	Paramount Theatre	Jagwar Twin
September 24, 2019	Minneapolis	United States	State Theatre	Jagwar Twin
September 26, 2019	Chicago	United States	Chicago Theatre	Jagwar Twin
September 28, 2019	Detroit	United States	Fox Theatre	Jagwar Twin
October 1, 2019	New York City	United States	The Rooftop at Pier 17	Jagwar Twin
October 3, 2019	Boston	United States	Orpheum Theatre	Jagwar Twin
October 5, 2019	Wallingford	United States	Toyota Oakdale Theatre	Jagwar Twin
October 6, 2019	Toronto	Canada	Meridian Hall	Jagwar Twin
October 8, 2019	Pittsburgh	United States	Roxian Theatre	Jagwar Twin
October 9, 2019	Oxon Hill	United States	MGM National Harbor Theater	Jagwar Twin
October 11, 2019	Bensalem	United States	Xcite Center	Jagwar Twin

== Cancelled shows ==
List of cancelled concerts
Date	City	Country	Venue	Reason
March 15, 2020	Milan	Italy	Lorenzini District	COVID-19 pandemic
March 16, 2020 (Note: The March 16, 2020, show was originally set to take place at Fabrique di Milan, but was rescheduled due to high demand.)	Milan	Italy	Lorenzini District	COVID-19 pandemic
April 23, 2020	Shenzhen	China	Shenzhen Bay Sports Center	COVID-19 pandemic
April 25, 2020	Foshan	China	GBA International Sports and Cultural Center	COVID-19 pandemic
April 27, 2020	Shanghai	China	Mercedes-Benz Arena	COVID-19 pandemic
April 29, 2020	Nanjing	China	Nanjing Olympic Sports Center Gymnasium	COVID-19 pandemic
May 8, 2020	Tokyo	Japan	Tokyo Garden Theatre	COVID-19 pandemic
May 20, 2020	Quezon City	Philippines	Smart Araneta Coliseum	COVID-19 pandemic
May 22, 2020	Taipei	Taiwan	Taipei Nangang Exhibition Center	COVID-19 pandemic
January 28, 2021	Tokyo	Japan	Tokyo Garden Theatre	COVID-19 pandemic
January 29, 2021	Tokyo	Japan	Tokyo Garden Theatre	COVID-19 pandemic
January 31, 2021	Nagoya	Japan	Aichi Sky Expo	COVID-19 pandemic
February 2, 2021	Osaka	Japan	Osaka Municipal Central Gymnasium	COVID-19 pandemic
February 9, 2021	Hong Kong		AsiaWorld–Arena	COVID-19 pandemic
February 23, 2021	Zürich	Switzerland	Samsung Hall	COVID-19 pandemic
February 24, 2021	Amsterdam	Netherlands	AFAS Live	COVID-19 pandemic
February 25, 2021	Cologne	Germany	Palladium	COVID-19 pandemic
February 28, 2021	London	England	O_{2} Brixton Academy	COVID-19 pandemic
March 1, 2021	London	England	O_{2} Brixton Academy	COVID-19 pandemic
March 2, 2021	London	England	O_{2} Brixton Academy	COVID-19 pandemic
March 4, 2021	Manchester	England	O_{2} Apollo	COVID-19 pandemic
March 8, 2021	Berlin	Germany	Knorkatorhalle	COVID-19 pandemic
March 9, 2021	Offenbach	Germany	Stadthalle Offenbach	COVID-19 pandemic
March 10, 2021	Munich	Germany	Zenith	COVID-19 pandemic
March 12, 2021	Milan	Italy	Lorenzini District	COVID-19 pandemic
March 14, 2021	Padua	Italy	Fiera	COVID-19 pandemic
March 17, 2021	Prague	Czech Republic	Tipsport Arena	COVID-19 pandemic
March 18, 2021 (Note: The March 18, 2021, show was originally set to take place at Gasometer, but was upgraded to a bigger venue due to high demand.)	Vienna	Austria	Wiener Stadthalle	COVID-19 pandemic
March 22, 2021	Brussels	Belgium	Forest National	COVID-19 pandemic
March 23, 2021 (Note: The March 23, 2021, show was originally set to take place at Olympia Hall, but was upgraded to a bigger venue due to high demand.)	Paris	France	Zénith de Paris	COVID-19 pandemic

== Personnel ==
- Avril Lavigne – lead vocals, rhythm guitar
- Steve Ferlazzo – keyboards, music director
- Dan Ellis – lead guitar, backing vocals
- David Immerman – rhythm guitar, backing vocals
- Matt Reilly – bass, backing vocals
- Chris Reeve – drums
