= Zane Carney =

American guitarist

- Born: New York City, U.S.
- Occupations: Guitarist; singer; songwriter; actor
- Musical career
- Origin: Los Angeles, California, U.S.
- Genres: Rock; jazz; pop
- Years active: 1990s–present
- Website: www.zanecarney.com

Zane Carney is an American guitarist, singer, songwriter and actor. He is best known for touring with John Mayer, performing as a guitarist in the Broadway musical Spider-Man: Turn Off the Dark, his solo albums, as a founding member of the band CARNEY with his brother Reeve Carney, and playing Tommy Barry on the CBS sitcom Dave's World (1993–1997).

Carney has recorded and performed with artists including Thundercat, Avril Lavigne, Stevie Wonder, Keith Urban and Justin Timberlake, and has released the solo albums Confluence (2013), Amalgam (2014) and Alter Ego (2021). In 2025 he joined the band Foster the People.

== Early life ==
Carney was born in New York City. At eight years old, he began appearing as the younger son on the CBS sitcom Dave's World, living between Manhattan and Los Angeles after which his family stayed in Los Angeles. He appeared in My Giant and The Boys Are Back.

Carney attended University of Southern California's Thornton School of Music.

== Career ==
=== CARNEY and Spider-Man: Turn Off the Dark ===
Zane Carney and his brother Reeve formed the band CARNEY. Zane was the guitarist, with Reeve fronting the band. The band was signed to Interscope Records and opened concerts for U2, Fergie and the Black Crowes.

Carney played guitar in the production of Spider-Man: Turn Off the Dark from its first preview in November 2010.

In 2013, Carney released Confluence, his first solo album and began touring with John Mayer.

Carney worked on Avril Lavigne's album Head Above Water, contributing guitar work on "Birdie", "I Fell in Love with the Devil" and "Crush" in which he co-wrote and also appeared as Lavigne's love interest Lucifer in the "I Fell in Love with the Devil" music video.

== Personal life ==
Carney is the younger brother of actor and musician Reeve Carney and the brother of songwriter Paris Carney, who also performs and writes under the name O'Neil Hudson.

== Selected discography ==
- Confluence
- Amalgam
- Film
- Alter Ego
- Zane Carney: Live in Tokyo // The Bootlegs (2018)
