= Head Above Water (album) =

2019 studio album by Avril Lavigne

Studio album by Avril Lavigne
- Released: February 15, 2019
- Recorded: December 2016 – May 2018
- Genre: Pop rock; pop
- Length: 41:25
- Label: BMG
- Producer: Avril Lavigne; Stephan Moccio; Johan Carlsson; Jon Levine; J.R. Rotem; Mitch Allan; Chris Baseford

Avril Lavigne chronology
Avril Lavigne (2013)	Head Above Water (2019)	Love Sux (2022)

Singles from Head Above Water
- 1. "Head Above Water" Released: September 19, 2018; 2. "Tell Me It's Over" Released: December 12, 2018; 3. "Dumb Blonde" Released: February 12, 2019; 4. "I Fell in Love with the Devil" Released: June 28, 2019

Head Above Water is the sixth studio album by Canadian singer-songwriter Avril Lavigne, released on February 15, 2019, through BMG Rights Management. It is her first studio album in six years, since her self-titled album (2013), thus marking the longest gap between two of her albums, and is her only album recorded for the new incarnation of BMG (she was originally signed to the first incarnation of BMG, which later relaunched after Sony's acquisition of BMG's former labels).

Lavigne assumed an integral role in the album's production and collaborated with several producers including Chad Kroeger, Stephan Moccio, Chris Baseford, Johan Carlsson, Lauren Christy from The Matrix, Ryan Cabrera, Travis Clark of We the Kings, Bonnie McKee, J.R. Rotem, and Mitch Allan, among others.

The album draws inspiration from Lavigne's battle with Lyme disease, with her describing the album as an "emotional journey". The title track was released as the lead single from the album in September 2018, followed by "Tell Me It's Over" as the second single in December 2018, "Dumb Blonde" as the third single the week of the album's release, a collaboration with rapper Nicki Minaj and "I Fell in Love with the Devil" as the fourth single in June 2019.

Head Above Water received generally mixed reviews from music critics. While some praised Lavigne's vocal performance, themes and maturity compared to the singer's previous works, some noted the "generic" sound of the album, criticizing the lyrics and production of certain songs. The album debuted at number five on the Billboard Canadian Albums chart, making it Lavigne's sixth album to enter the top ten in Canada. In the United States the album debuted at number thirteen on the Billboard 200 chart. In the United Kingdom the album debuted and peaked at number ten on the UK Albums OCC chart.

In support of the album, Lavigne embarked on the Head Above Water Tour, starting on September 14, 2019 (her first tour in nearly five years following the Avril Lavigne Tour).

== Background and development ==
In December 2014, Lavigne was diagnosed with Lyme disease. According to her, she "sat behind a piano and sang past the pain". The songs on the album are inspired by her battle with Lyme disease. On December 25, 2016, Lavigne announced that she would release the album in 2017. On March 1, 2017, Lavigne announced that she had signed with BMG Rights Management and promised to release the album in 2017. On January 21, 2018, Lavigne responded to a fan on Twitter about the album, saying: "[The album is] personal, dear, intimate, dramatic, raw, powerful, strong and unexpected. This record is a true emotional journey." On February 7, 2018, Lavigne posted on Twitter about the album, saying: "I've started mixing my album and all of the pieces are finally coming together. These songs are so close to my heart. Wish me luck while I throw every last drop of me into these final stages." In May, Lavigne finished recording the album, though she was reported to have worked with songwriter Bonnie McKee afterwards.

On July 7, 2018, Lavigne stated that the album cover was being shot that week. On August 18, 2018, Lavigne posted on her social media: "Exciting things coming" and "prepping for my video shoot". On September 6, 2018, Lavigne posted a letter to her fans on her official website, revealing she wrote and recorded most of the album on her couch due to Lyme disease. She also stated that "Head Above Water" was the first song she wrote for the album. To Lavigne, recording this album was a "victorious moment" and a "huge accomplishment", describing it as "a very strong, triumphant, powerful and true record to me and my experiences over the last few years". On December 7, the singer revealed that the name of the album as Head Above Water and the tracklist. Along with revealing the album title, Lavigne also unveiled the cover artwork. The front cover shows her nude sitting in a pool of water holding an acoustic guitar close to her body.

== Composition and themes ==
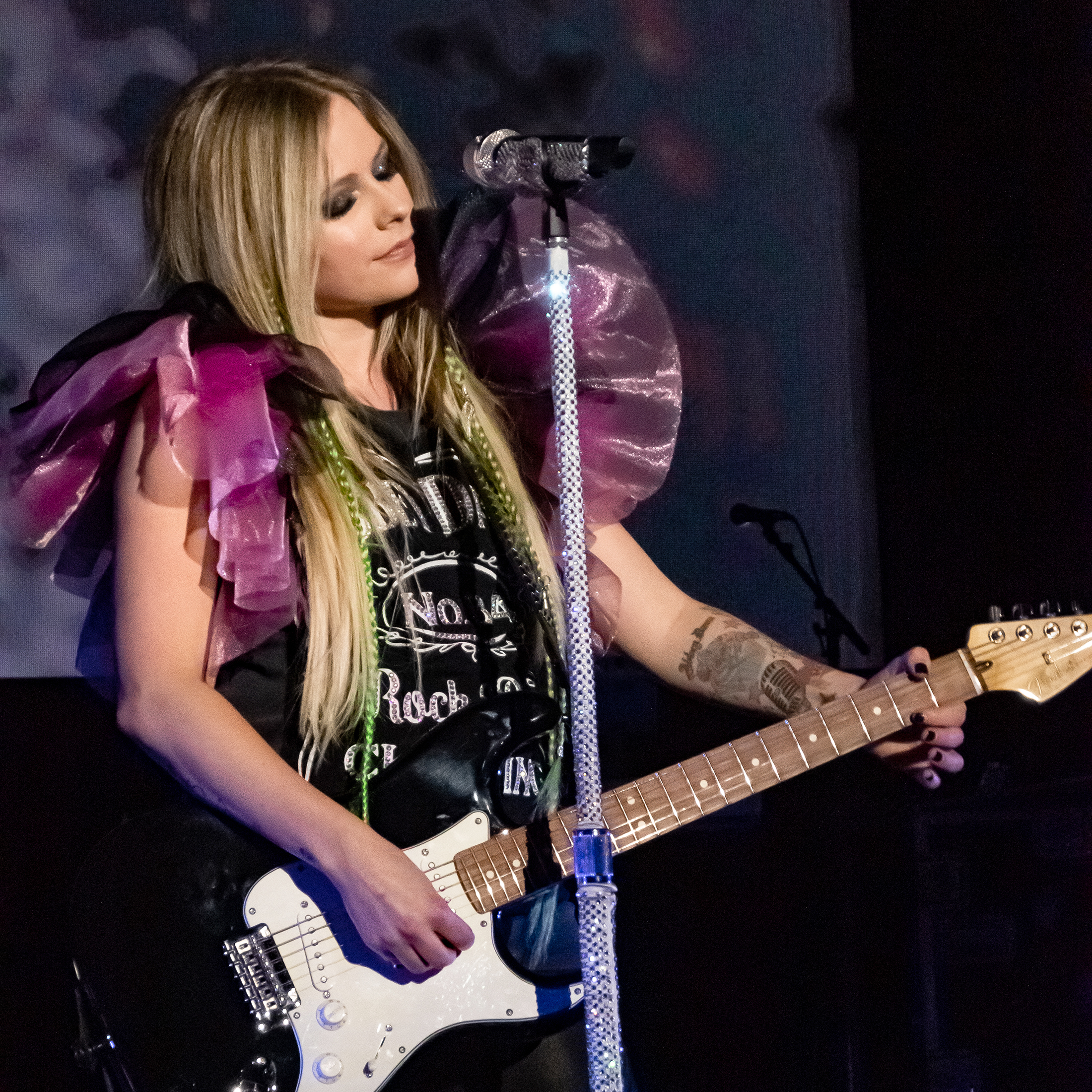
Lavigne during a performance in Los Angeles, September 2019.

In an interview with Entertainment Weekly, Lavigne explained that she "wanted to make this record about the vocals so you could really hear the lyrics and feel the emotion because sometimes the music can be overbearing", and to "explore with different sounds like "Crush" and "Tell Me It's Over"; they're a little bit more throwback and jazzy." She also described the album as "going back to my roots — I got my start in church and musical theater before I started writing my own music.".

=== Songs ===
Head Above Water opens with its title track, an "empowering" pop rock and Christian rock ballad, backed by steady-building mix of piano, strings, synths and thunderous drums".

Second track "Birdie" contains "gloomy, feet-crunching-in snow beats" and lyrics about feeling trapped. Regarding the song's inspiration, Lavigne said "I had that concept in my head two years before I wrote it. I was feeling bad. I kept saying to myself, "I feel like I'm a bird locked up in a cage. I feel like I'm in jail." I was just stuck with a bunch of s–t. That's where that concept came from. It's not necessarily about my illness but about other stuff in my life. I love that song because it has an empowering message of standing up for yourself, doing something about a situation you're in, taking charge, and removing yourself. I think a lot of people can relate to that whether that's a toxic relationship they're in, or they're not happy with their job."

Third track "I Fell in Love with the Devil" is an "ominous, tightly crafted rumination on toxic relationships", which Lavigne wrote "as a constant reminder to [herself] that some of the darkest people in this world can be disguised as angels".

The album's fourth track and second single "Tell Me It's Over" is a Memphis soul and rhythm and blues ballad. Lavigne explained in a statement that the song is about "being strong, finally putting your foot down and closing the door on a relationship that you know is wrong after time and time again of falling for their games." About her inspirations to write the song, Lavigne said, "The vocals and the lyrics are very vulnerable which is reflective of the feelings I had in relationships like these. I wanted to write something classic and have been inspired by some of the timeless queens I listen to everyday at home, Billie Holiday, Ella Fitzgerald, Aretha Franklin and Etta James."

Fifth track and third single "Dumb Blonde" is a "fiery" and "plucky" mix of pop, pop punk, power pop, hip hop, punk rock and urban music; with Lavigne describing the conception of the song as "something I actually went through where I had an experience with someone calling me a dumb blonde. I was like, 'Ooh that's a good concept and title.' It started as a misogynist intimidated by my independence. I just thought that was really unfair."

Sixth track "It Was in Me" is an "earnestly delivered self-empowerment anthem", which Lavigne compared to her 2002 single "I'm with You". Seventh track "Souvenir" was described by Pitchfork as a "sun-drenched love song", and features lyrics "guardedly optimistic about a new love". Eighth track "Crush" is "retro-leaning" and "a warm ode to the more fluid moments of early love".

Ninth track "Goddess" "comes on with a playful note, wishing for a simpler time with breezy sonic flair", while tenth track "Bigger Wow" was said by NME to "sound like a cross between Shania Twain and Sheryl Crow". Eleventh track "Love Me Insane" was described by Rolling Stone as containing a "half-yodel" which "is a hook in itself". Twelfth and final track "Warrior" is a ballad described by Lavigne as "one of the first songs I wrote for the album" and according to her, is "about the health battle I continue to fight every day".

== Singles ==
The song "Head Above Water" serves as the album's lead single. It was released on September 19, 2018, and impacted hot adult contemporary radio and Christian radio on October 8, 2018. The song was described as "a powerful, spiritual epiphany detailing the Canadian singer's journey through her battle with Lyme disease." The single was certified 2× Platinum in Canada and Platinum in Brazil and US.

"Tell Me It's Over" was announced as the second single from the album on December 5, 2018, and was released the following December 12, with the album's pre-order. The album's third single, "Dumb Blonde", was released on February 12, 2019, featuring rapper Nicki Minaj, it debuted at number ninety-two on the Canadian Singles chart. "I Fell in Love with the Devil" was announced as the fourth single from the album on June 7, 2019, and was released on June 28.

"We Are Warriors" was released as a new version of her song "Warrior", and was released as a charity single on April 24, 2020, for the COVID-19 pandemic.

== Critical reception ==
Professional ratings
Aggregate scores
Source	Rating
Metacritic	55/100
Review scores
Source	Rating
AllMusic	4/5 stars
Clash	7/10
Exclaim!	6/10
The Guardian	2/5 stars
Idolator	3.5/5
The Independent	3/5 stars
NME	3/5 stars
Punknews	4/5 stars
Pitchfork	5.5/10
Rolling Stone	2.5/5 stars

Head Above Water received mixed reviews from music critics. At Metacritic, which assigns a normalized rating out of 100 to reviews from mainstream critics, the album has an average score of 55 based on 12 reviews, indicating "mixed or average reviews".

Lavigne's vocals were complimented by critics; Arielle Gordon, writing for Pitchfork, commented that Head Above Water "is an album about resilience, one that explores the range of her vocal chords, with little time for the scream-singing that once defined her sound"; and David Needleman of Rolling Stone writing that Lavigne has "never sounded stronger or more vocally confident". The album was also noted to show maturity compared to Lavigne's previous works; with Nick Levine of NME writing that Head Above Water "isn't her most banging album, but it is a deeply honest one that sounds a lot like growing up gracefully."

Many critics noted a generic sound to the album. Alexandra Pollard from The Independent wrote that the album "might not have found a musical identity that truly becomes her, but Head Above Water is an effective, and occasionally affecting, album". In an article for Exclaim!, Ian Gormely observed that "Across the record's 12 tracks, Lavigne tries on a variety of styles, inhabiting each with ease, but rarely manages to rise above and make the sound her own". Marianna Lozowska called the album "boring", being "[Lavigne's] own worst nightmare" while writing for Now. Dylan Tuck gave the album 2/5 stars in an article for The Skinny, acknowledging the powerful ballads such as the lead single, but negatively spoke about the majority of the album, noting that "it [felt] much like a lost Lavigne seeking a sound that’ll just keep her afloat".

== Accolades ==
Accolades for Head Above Water
Award	Year	Category	Result	Ref.
GAFFA Awards (Denmark)	2020	Best International Album	Longlisted	
Japan Gold Disc Awards	2020	Best 3 Albums	Won	
Juno Awards	2020	Pop Album of the Year	Nominated	

== Commercial performance ==
Head Above Water debuted at number five on the Billboard Canadian Albums chart. In the United States the album debuted at number thirteen on the US Billboard 200 chart, with 29,000 units on its first week. It also became the lowest entry on the chart, comparing to the previous one, Avril Lavigne (2013) that sold 44,000 copies. On the Billboard Independent Albums, the album peaked at number one. In the United Kingdom the album debuted and peaked at number 10 with 5,766 units sold. It also went straight to number one on the UK Independent Albums. In Germany, the album debuted at number three, making it her best performance on the chart since The Best Damn Thing (2007). Overall, the album reached top 10 positions in 10 countries. In Japan, the album had sold 42,424 copies by the end 2019. Head Above Water was certified Gold in Denmark selling 10,000 units.

== Track listing ==
Head Above Water track listing
No.	Title	Writer(s)	Producer(s)	Length
1.	"Head Above Water"	Avril Lavigne; Travis Clark; Stephan Moccio	Moccio; Jay Paul Bicknell^{[a]}; Chad Kroeger^{[b]}; Chris Baseford^{[b]}	3:40
2.	"Birdie"	Lavigne; J.R. Rotem	Rotem; Baseford^{[b]}	3:35
3.	"I Fell in Love with the Devil"	Lavigne	Baseford; Lavigne	4:15
4.	"Tell Me It's Over"	Lavigne; Melissa Bel; Ryan Cabrera; Justin Gray; Johan Carlsson	Carlsson; Noah "Mailbox" Passovoy^{[b]}	3:09
5.	"Dumb Blonde" (featuring Nicki Minaj)	Lavigne; Mitch Allan; Bonnie McKee; Onika Maraj	Allan; McKee^{[a]}; Baseford^{[b]}; Scott Robinson^{[b]}	3:34
6.	"It Was in Me"	Lavigne; Lauren Christy; Carlsson	Carlsson; Christy^{[b]}	3:43
7.	"Souvenir"	Lavigne; Christy	Jon Levine; Christy	2:57
8.	"Crush"	Lavigne; Zane Carney; Carlsson	Carlsson; Passovoy^{[b]}	3:33
9.	"Goddess"	Lavigne; Carlsson; Ross Golan	Carlsson	3:41
10.	"Bigger Wow"	Lavigne; Christy; Levine	Levine; Christy	2:55
11.	"Love Me Insane"	Lavigne; Christy	Levine; Christy	3:00
12.	"Warrior"	Lavigne; Clark; Kroeger	Lavigne	3:45
Total length:				41:25

Japanese edition bonus track
No.	Title	Writer(s)	Producer(s)	Length
13.	"Head Above Water" (featuring Travis Clark of We the Kings)	Lavigne; Clark; Moccio	Moccio; Bicknell^{[a]}; Kroeger^{[b]}; Baseford^{[b]}; Blake Healy^{[b]}	3:40
Total length:				45:05

Notes

- ^{^[a]} signifies an additional producer
- ^{^[b]} signifies a vocal producer
- "Dumb Blonde" does not feature Nicki Minaj on physical releases and runs 3:09 instead of 3:34.

== Personnel ==
Vocals

- Avril Lavigne – vocals (all tracks)
- Nicki Minaj – vocals (track 5)
- Travis Clark – vocals (track 13 (bonus))
- Stephan Moccio – background vocals (tracks 1, 13 (bonus))
- Kylen Deporter – background vocals (tracks 1, 13 (bonus))
- Johan Carlsson – background vocals (tracks 4, 6, 8)
- Maiya Sykes – background vocals (tracks 4, 6, 8)
- Mika Lett – background vocals (tracks 4, 6, 8)

Instrumentation

- Stephan Moccio – piano, keyboards (tracks 1, 13 (bonus))
- Jay Paul Bicknell – drum programming, keyboards (tracks 1, 13 (bonus))
- Jonathan Martin Berry – guitar (tracks 1, 13 (bonus))
- Paul Bushnell – bass (tracks 1, 13 (bonus))
- Aaron Sterling – drums (tracks 1, 13 (bonus))
- Chris Baseford – drum programming (tracks 1, 13 (bonus))
- Kevin Fox – cello (tracks 1, 13 (bonus))
- Vanessa Freebairn-Smith – cello (tracks 1, 13 (bonus))
- J. R. Rotem – keyboards (track 2)
- Zane Carney – guitar (tracks 2–3), electric guitar (track 8)
- Larry Gold – string arranger (tracks 3, 12)
- Johan Carlsson – piano, B3, bass (tracks 4, 6, 8), wurlitzer (track 4), acoustic guitar (tracks 4, 6, 8–9), electric guitar (tracks 4, 8), tambourine (tracks 6, 8), handclaps (track 6), shaker, mellotron, Juno synth, marimba (track 8), pads (track 9)
- Mattias Bylund – strings, string arrangement (tracks 4, 6, 8), synthesizer, horn arrangement (track 4), synth pads (tracks 6, 8)
- Mattias Johansson – violin (tracks 4, 6, 8)
- David Bukovinszky – cello (tracks 4, 6, 8)
- Janne Bjerger – trumpets (track 4)
- Tomas Jonsson – tenor saxophone (track 4)
- Wojtek Goral – baritone saxophone (track 4)
- Peter Noos Johansson – trombone (track 4)
- Corky James – guitar (track 7)
- Michel Zitron – taiko (track 8)
- Jeremy Lertola – acoustic guitars (track 9)

Production

- Stephan Moccio – production, vocal production (tracks 1, 13 (bonus))
- Jay Paul Bicknell – additional production (tracks 1, 13 (bonus))
- Chris Baseford – vocal production (tracks 1–2, 5, 13 (bonus)), production (track 3)
- Chad Kroeger – vocal production (tracks 1, 13 (bonus))
- J. R. Rotem – production (track 2)
- Johan Carlsson – production (tracks 4, 6, 8–9), vocal production (tracks 6, 9)
- Noah "Mailbox" Passovoy – vocal production (tracks 4, 8)
- Mitch Allan – production, vocal production (track 5)
- Bonnie McKee – additional production (track 5)
- Scott Robinson – vocal production (track 5)
- Lauren Christy – vocal production (track 6), production (tracks 7, 10–11)
- Jon Levine – production (tracks 7, 10–11)
- Avril Lavigne – production (track 12)
- Blake Healy – vocal production (track 13 (bonus))

Technical

- Jay Paul Bicknell – engineering (tracks 1, 13 (bonus))
- Chris Baseford – engineering (tracks 1–3, 13 (bonus)), vocal engineering (track 6), mixing engineering (track 12)
- Kylen Deporter – assistant engineering (tracks 1, 13 (bonus))
- Aaron Sterling – additional engineering (tracks 1, 13 (bonus))
- Şerban Ghenea – mixing engineering (tracks 1–4, 6, 8–9, 13 (bonus))
- John Hanes – engineering (tracks 1–4, 6, 8–9, 13 (bonus))
- J. R. Rotem – programming (track 2)
- Sam Kalandjian – engineering (track 2)
- Scott Robinson – vocal engineering (track 2)
- Larry Gold – strings conductor (tracks 3, 12)
- Johan Carlsson – programming (tracks 4, 6, 9)
- Mattias Bylund – strings and horns recording engineering (track 4), strings engineering, strings editor (track 6)
- Sam Holland – recording engineering (tracks 4, 9), engineering (tracks 6, 8)
- Jeremy Lertola – engineering (tracks 4, 6, 8–9), programming (track 9)
- Cory Bice – assistant engineering (tracks 4, 6, 8–9)
- Chantry Johnson – vocal engineering (track 5)
- Caleb Hulin – vocal engineering (track 5)
- Tony Maserati – mixing engineering (track 5)
- Jon Levine – mixing (track 7)
- Serge Courtois – mixing engineering (tracks 10–11)
- Chris Gehringer – mastering engineering (all tracks)
- Will Quinnell – mastering assistant (all tracks)

Artwork

- David Needleman – photography
- Randall Leddy – art direction and design

== Charts ==
=== Weekly charts ===
Weekly chart performance for Head Above Water
Chart (2019)	Peak position
Australian Albums (ARIA)	9
Austrian Albums (Ö3 Austria)	2
Belgian Albums (Ultratop Flanders)	12
Belgian Albums (Ultratop Wallonia)	25
Canadian Albums (Billboard)	5
Czech Albums (ČNS IFPI)	11
Dutch Albums (Album Top 100)	18
Finnish Albums (Suomen virallinen lista)	41
French Albums (SNEP)	34
German Albums (Offizielle Top 100)	3
Irish Albums (IRMA)	25
Italian Albums (FIMI)	6
Japanese Albums (Oricon)	7
Japanese Hot Albums (Billboard Japan)	3
Lithuanian Albums (AGATA)	51
New Zealand Albums (RMNZ)	21
Polish Albums (ZPAV)	31
Portuguese Albums (AFP)	11
Scottish Albums (Official Charts)	8
Slovak Albums (ČNS IFPI)	35
Spanish Albums (Promusicae)	18
Swiss Albums (Schweizer Hitparade)	4
UK Albums (Official Charts)	10
UK Independent Albums (Official Charts)	1
US Billboard 200	13
US Independent Albums (Billboard)	1

=== Year-end charts ===
Year-end chart performance for Head Above Water
Chart (2019)	Position
US Independent Albums (Billboard)	21
US Top Current Album Sales (Billboard)	153

== Certifications ==
Region	Certification	Certified units/sales
Denmark (IFPI Danmark)	Gold	10,000^{‡}
^{‡} Sales+streaming figures based on certification alone.

== Release history ==
Release history and formats for Head Above Water
Country	Date	Format	Label	Ref.
Various	February 15, 2019	CD; digital download; streaming	BMG	
