= Fly (Avril Lavigne song) =

Single by Avril Lavigne
- Released: April 16, 2015
- Recorded: 2012
- Genre: Pop rock
- Length: 3:06
- Songwriters: Avril Lavigne; Chad Kroeger; David Hodges
- Producers: Avril Lavigne; Chris Baseford

Avril Lavigne singles chronology
"Give You What You Like" (2015)	"Fly" (2015)	"Head Above Water" (2018)

Music video
- "Fly" on YouTube

"Fly" is a song by Canadian singer Avril Lavigne. It was released on April 16, 2015, for digital download by the Special Olympics, Inc. Lavigne released the song as a charity single for the Avril Lavigne Foundation to support the 2015 Special Olympics World Summer Games. The song was written by Lavigne, Chad Kroeger and David Hodges. All the proceeds from the single will be contributed to the ongoing work being done by the Avril Lavigne Foundation.

== Background ==
"Fly" was written during the sessions for Lavigne's fifth studio album. It was inspired lyrically by the people she had met through her Foundation, which raises funds for young people living with disabilities and serious illnesses. The song was recorded in 2012 with the intention of being on the album, but it didn't make the final cut. Lavigne later mentioned the song in interviews, and her desire to release it in the future. After suggestion from her fanbase, she chose to release the song as a charity single to coincide with the 2015 Special Olympics World Games. Lyrically, the song sings about overcoming any obstacles someone might face. Originally, the song had a more pop production but Lavigne scrapped it for a more stripped-down, vocal-driven version. According to Lavigne, the song is composed of a "piano, orchestra and kick drum."

In September 2014, Charles Miguel Ignacio as part of the Avril Lavigne Foundation's support for Special Olympics, Lavigne launched a campaign for her 30th birthday, which raised funds to support 30 Special Olympics athletes competing in the 2015 Special Olympics World Games. During her 2014 World Tour, Lavigne visited a local Special Olympics Program in Shanghai to learn more about their work, and met with and invited more than 200 Special Olympics athletes to her shows in 14 countries. "Fly" was released 100 days before the start of the 2015 Special Olympics World Games, which took place from July 25 till August 2, 2015 in Los Angeles.

During a new interview with Good Morning America, Lavigne said that the song has taken on another meaning now following her Lyme disease diagnosis, "[The song is] about inner strength and courage... The message of the song is to show the world that they can overcome the challenges and that everyone is meant to shine and this song took on a whole new meaning for me during the time that I've been sick, which was pretty magical." She said that Lyme disease had left her bedridden for months; "I could barely eat, and when we went to the pool, I had to leave and go lie in bed. My friends asked, 'What's wrong?' I didn't know. I had no idea a bug bite could do this. I was bedridden for five months. I felt like I couldn't breathe, I couldn't talk and I couldn't move. I thought I was dying."

== Composition ==
Lavigne co-wrote "Fly" with her estranged husband Chad Kroeger and David Hodges, with production being handled by Lavigne herself and Chris Baseford. It is a pop rock power ballad which lasts over three minutes and six seconds. Its instrumentation features an orchestral piano, a string section, an acoustic drum kit and bass. Lyrically, the song talks about the inner strength and courage of someone to face the challenges in life.

"This song means a lot to me personally," Lavigne said of the track. "It is inspired by the many young people I've met throughout my work with my Foundation. They pursue their dreams no matter what obstacles they face... Special Olympics' mission is to unleash the human spirit through the transformative power and joy of sports, so they're a natural fit for this song." she added.

== Music video ==
The music video for "Fly" was directed by Avril Lavigne and Robb Dipple. The video was premiered on Good Morning America on April 16, 2015, and shows various clips from the Special Olympics and moments of Lavigne recording the song. As of June 18, 2018, Vevo made it private on YouTube and it can no longer be watched on Avril's YouTube channel.

== Live performances ==
Avril Lavigne performed "Fly" for the first time at the opening ceremony of Special Olympics L.A Games 2015 on July 25.

== Credits and personnel ==
- Avril Lavigne – lead vocals, songwriter, producer
- Chris Baseford – producer, engineering, programming
- Chad Kroeger – songwriter, guitar
- David Hodges – songwriter, background vocals, piano
- Filip Jančík – Violin
- Andrew Schubert – additional engineering
- Adam Chagnon – additional engineering
- Chris Lord-Alge at Mix LA – audio mixing
- Keith Armstrong – assistant mixing
- Nik Karpen – assistant mixing
- Ted Jensen – mastering

== Charts ==
Chart (2015)	Peak position
Canada Hot 100 (Billboard)	92

== Release history ==
Region	Date	Format	Label	Ref.
Worldwide	April 16, 2015	Digital download	Special Olympics, Inc.	
