= Tell Me It's Over =

Single by Avril Lavigne

from the album Head Above Water
- Released: December 12, 2018
- Genre: Memphis soul; R&B
- Length: 3:09
- Label: BMG
- Songwriters: Avril Lavigne; Melissa Bel; Ryan Cabrera; Johan Carlsson; Justin Gray
- Producer: Johan Carlsson

Avril Lavigne singles chronology
"Head Above Water" (2018)	"Tell Me It's Over" (2018)	"Dumb Blonde" (2019)

Music video
- "Tell Me It's Over" on YouTube

"Tell Me It's Over" is a song by Canadian singer-songwriter Avril Lavigne, released as the second single from her sixth studio album Head Above Water (2019) on December 12, 2018 along with the album pre-order. It follows the album's lead single, "Head Above Water". Lavigne posted the cover art and announced the release date on her social media on December 5. She had previously posted pictures from the video accompanied by the line "Cause it don't feel like it's over whenever you're closing the door".

== Composition ==
"Tell Me It's Over" is a Memphis soul and R&B ballad. Lavigne explained in a statement that the song is about "being strong, finally putting your foot down and closing the door on a relationship that you know is wrong after time and time again of falling for their games." About her inspirations to write the song, Lavigne said, "The vocals and the lyrics are very vulnerable which is reflective of the feelings I had in relationships like these. I wanted to write something classic and have been inspired by some of the timeless queens I listen to everyday [sic] at home, Billie Holiday, Ella Fitzgerald, Aretha Franklin and Etta James."

== Music video ==
The song's accompanying music video premiered on December 12, 2018, on Lavigne's YouTube channel. It was directed by Erica Silverman. It finds Lavigne sharing a love-filled Christmas with her boyfriend before things start to fall apart and he smashes her phone on the ground amid another fight.

== Charts ==
Chart performance for "Tell Me It's Over"
Chart (2018)	Peak position
Belgium (Ultratip Bubbling Under Wallonia)	39
Canadian Hot Digital Song Sales (Billboard)	20
New Zealand Hot Singles (Recorded Music NZ)	39
US Digital Song Sales (Billboard)	36

== Release history ==
Release history and formats for "Tell Me It's Over"
Country	Date	Format	Label	Ref.
Various	December 12, 2018	Digital download; streaming	BMG	
