= Dumb Blonde (Avril Lavigne song) =

2019 single by Avril Lavigne featuring Nicki Minaj

Single by Avril Lavigne featuring Nicki Minaj

from the album Head Above Water
- Released: February 12, 2019
- Genre: Pop-punk; power pop; hip-hop
- Length: 3:34
- Label: BMG
- Songwriters: Avril Lavigne; Onika Maraj; Mitch Allan; Bonnie McKee
- Producer: Mitch Allan

Avril Lavigne singles chronology
"Tell Me It's Over" (2018)	"Dumb Blonde" (2019)	"I Fell in Love with the Devil" (2019)

Nicki Minaj singles chronology
"Touch Down (Remix)" (2018)	"Dumb Blonde" (2019)	"Wobble Up" (2019)

Lyric video
- "Dumb Blonde" on YouTube

"Dumb Blonde" is a song by Canadian singer-songwriter Avril Lavigne featuring rapper Nicki Minaj. It was released on February 12, 2019, and serves as the third single from her sixth studio album, Head Above Water (2019). The song was originally recorded by Lavigne as a solo artist, but was later recorded with an additional verse written and performed by Minaj. The solo version of the song is featured on physical editions of the album.

"Dumb Blonde" was written by Lavigne, Minaj and its producers Mitch Allan, and Bonnie McKee. It is a power pop and hip-hop song that is about self-love and female empowerment. Several music critics labeled it a "feminist anthem".

== Background and release ==
On December 7, 2018, Lavigne revealed the final tracklist for her sixth studio album, Head Above Water, that included a solo song titled "Dumb Blonde" as track number five. On February 7, 2019, the album's track listing on Amazon was updated, confirming that the song features rapper Nicki Minaj. In fact, the song was 26 seconds longer than when it originally appeared on music platforms (3:08 to 3:34), which suggests that Minaj's verse was added in the last minute. That day, Lavigne teased the track by unveiling a nine-second-long snippet along with a statement detailing themes that inspired the concept. On February 11, Chinese streaming service Xiami confirmed that the joint track is set to be released the following day as the album's third single. The official cover art, that features Lavigne sucking a lollipop, plays up a "dumb blonde" stereotype.

== Composition and lyrics ==
"Dumb Blonde" is a "fiery" and "plucky" pop-punk, power pop, and hip-hop song, that mixes elements of punk rock and urban. It was written by Lavigne, Minaj, Mitch Allan, and Bonnie McKee with production done by Allan alongside McKee, Chris Baseford, and Scott Robinson. The track is three minutes and thirty-four seconds long. Lavigne described it as "the most uptempo song on the album." The song's instrumentation features heavy guitar synths, an "infectious" drumline and "driving" beats. Similarities were noted between the song and American rock artists Joan Jett and Sleigh Bells, as well as Lavigne's own 2007 album The Best Damn Thing (specifically, its lead single, "Girlfriend"), while the vocals were compared to American punk rock band M.I.A. Lyrically, it's a "self-empowerment anthem" and "a sassy clap-back to a man who underestimated her", which deals with "the idea that people might think [Lavigne]'s not as smart as she is based on the way she looks". Minaj's verse features references to her 2014 album The Pinkprint and single "No Frauds".

About the song's concept and idea, Lavigne told Entertainment Weekly: "It's something I actually went through where I had an experience with someone calling me a dumb blonde. I was like, 'Ooh that's a good concept and title.' It started as a misogynist intimidated by my independence. I just thought that was really unfair." In an Instagram post, she continues: "I brought it to Bonnie McKee and Mitch Allan, who helped me bring it to life. [...] I was belittled and made to feel bad for who I was: A leader, someone with a vision and opinions, someone who has strength, desire, passion and goals. [...] Fuck stereotypes. [...] Yes, women should build each other up, but so should men and women."

== Critical reception ==
"Dumb Blonde" was met with mixed to negative reception, with most critics calling it "a failed attempt at a girl power anthem". Notably, Forbes magazine named the song the 4th worst song of 2019. Similarly, Callie Ahlgrim of Insider ranked "Dumb Blonde" among the worst songs of 2019, calling it "deeply uninspired" and criticizing Lavigne's decision to collaborate with Nicki Minaj. Brittany Spanos from Rolling Stone complimented the song's "empowerment" theme and described it as "the power pop kiss-off" track. Nick Levine from NME, while reviewing Head Above Water, called the song "a sassy clap-back to a man who underestimated her." Allison Bowsher from Much considered that the song is "the rock pop sensibilities of the early ’90s, with an infectious drum line backing and call and answer chorus that is begging to be blasted from every radio station." She also praised Lavigne's decision to collaborate with Minaj and said that "Minaj is the perfect collaborator for the new single, bringing her own style of bravado and badassness (we’re making it a word) that could make “Dumb Blonde” a huge hit for both artists."

Ian Gavan, in his review for Nylon, wrote that "Dumb Blonde" was "a new feminist pep rally anthem". He praised commercial and public appeal of the song, as well as Minaj's rap section: "Just because she's cute and sweet, doesn't mean she incompetent". Lucas Villa of AXS also complimented Minaj's performance and characterized her verse as "explosive". Alex Darus of Alternative Press praised the overall composition and saw that "Minaj's feature feels like a perfect fit".

Madelin Roth of MTV proclaimed Lavigne and Minaj "the hottest power pop duo today". Katherine Gillespie of Paper praised "Dumb Blonde" and added that "it somehow manages to combine every genre Lavigne has ever dabbled in over the course of a prolific pop-punk career." In a review for Complex, Tara Mahadevan claimed that the song and the lyrics were "uplifting" and "empowering". Exclaim!'s Josiah Hughes published a rave review and called the song "punk pop banger". Rap Up applauded track's encouraging lyrical message.

Ming Lee Newcomb of Consequence of Sound described "Dumb Blonde" as "cheeky, drum-heavy track". She noted that "song solidifies the sk8er girl's effort to make a cultural comeback". Israel Daramota of Spin praised "anthemic" nature of the composition. He felt that "['Dumb Blonde']'s percussion-based track owes a lot more to Gwen Stefani's 'Hollaback Girl' mold, but it also captures the sneering attitude found on Lavigne's best known tracks." Glenn Rowley from Billboard called the song a "fiery collaboration". While reviewing "Dumb Blonde", Melody Lau from CBC Music complemented the idea of challenging 'dumb blonde' stereotypes. Mike Nied from Idolator made the observation that "Dumb Blonde" was one of the "sort of fiery banger that deserves plenty of radio play."

Alex Zidel of HotNewHipHop gave a positive review and expected "Dumb Blonde" to be "iconic as both the artists behind it". He considered the song was "a definitely a feel-good joint" between Lavigne and Minaj.

== Live performances ==
On February 15, 2019, Lavigne released on her YouTube channel her first live performance of the song on the Honda Stage at Henson Recording Studios, from a partnership between iHeartRadio and Honda. On June 17, 2019, Lavigne performed a short version of the song at the Radio Disney ARDYS Awards 2019 along with shorter versions of previous hits, "Sk8er Boi", "Complicated" and "Head Above Water" respectively. Avril Lavigne also performed the song on her Head Above Water Tour 2019.

== Chart performance and in other media ==
"Dumb Blonde" debuted at number 92 on the Canadian Hot 100 chart, number 24 on the US Pop Digital Song Sales chart, number 14 on the Japan Hot Overseas, number 22 on the UK Independent Singles Chart, and number 16 on the New Zealand Hot Singles. Overall, "Dumb Blonde" moderately peaked in seven countries component charts, making it the second chart successful single on the album behind 2018 lead single "Head Above Water".

The song was included in the second trailer for The Hustle.

== Credits and personnel ==
Credits and personnel adapted from Head Above Water album liner notes.

Management

- Almo Music Corp. (ASCAP) / Avril Lavigne Publishing LLC. (SOCAN), I Wish I Could Read Music / Beats of Primary Wave (BMI) - Administered by Songs of Kobalt Music Publishing, Bonnie McKee Music / Songs of Pulse Recordings / Where da Kasz At (BMI)
- Nicki Minaj appears courtesy of Young Money Entertainment/Cash Money Records/Republic Records

Personnel

- Avril Lavigne – main vocals, songwriting
- Nicki Minaj – featured vocals, songwriting
- Mitch Allan – songwriting, production, vocal production
- Bonnie McKee – songwriting, additional production
- Chris Baseford – vocal production
- Scott Robinson – vocal production
- Chantry Johnson – vocal engineering
- Caleb Hulin – vocal engineering
- Tony Maserati – mixing engineering
- Chris Gehringer – mastering engineering
- Will Quinnell – mastering assistance

== Charts ==
Chart (2019)	Peak position
Canada Hot 100 (Billboard)	92
Czech Republic Airplay (ČNS IFPI)	63
Japan Hot Overseas (Billboard Japan)	14
Lithuania (AGATA)	93
New Zealand Hot Singles (RMNZ)	16
UK Indie (Official Charts)	22
US Pop Digital Songs (Billboard)	24

== Release history ==
Release dates and formats
Region	Date	Format(s)	Version	Label	Ref.
Various	February 12, 2019	Digital download; streaming	Original	BMG	
Italy	February 15, 2019	Radio airplay	Original	BMG	
Japan	June 3, 2019	Digital download	Solo	BMG	
