= Head Above Water (song) =

Single by Avril Lavigne

from the album Head Above Water
- Released: September 19, 2018
- Genre: Christian rock; pop rock
- Length: 3:40
- Label: BMG
- Songwriters: Avril Lavigne; Stephan Moccio; Travis Clark
- Producer: Stephan Moccio

Avril Lavigne singles chronology
"Fly" (2015)	"Head Above Water" (2018)	"Tell Me It's Over" (2018)

Music video
- "Head Above Water" on YouTube

"Head Above Water" is a song by Canadian singer-songwriter Avril Lavigne from her sixth studio album of the same name (2019). It was written by Lavigne and Travis Clark of We the Kings alongside its producer Stephan Moccio. It was released as the lead single from the album on September 19, 2018, by BMG Rights Management. It is Lavigne's first single since "Fly", released in April 2015. Commercially, the song peaked at number 64 on the US Billboard Hot 100, and entered the charts of 24 other countries and regions. In August 2019, a new version featuring vocals from We the Kings' Travis Clark was released.

== Background and release ==
Those were the worst years of my life as I went through both physical and emotional battles. I was able to turn that fight into music I'm really proud of. I wrote songs in my bed and on the couch and recorded there mostly as well. Words and lyrics that were so true to my experience came pouring out of me effortlessly

— Lavigne on releasing "Head Above Water" as the album's lead single.

After more than a year from the release of the last single from her fifth studio album, on December 25, 2016, Lavigne announced via her Instagram account that she was working on new music for her upcoming sixth studio album.

On August 18, 2018, Lavigne posted on Instagram that new music is coming in September. At the end of August, the song "Head Above Water" was registered and Lavigne deleted almost all her pictures on Instagram.

On September 1, Lavigne shared a picture of her underwater via her social media. Several people reported that the image was related to the song "Head Above Water". On September 6, Lavigne posted a lengthy letter to her fans on her website detailing her struggle with Lyme disease in the past few years and how she overcame it. This also included a release date for "Head Above Water". She wrote on the letter about the song "I had accepted death and could feel my body shutting down. I felt like I was drowning. Like I was going under water and I just needed to come up for air. Like I was in a river being pulled in a current. Unable to breathe. Praying to God for Him to help me just keep my head above the water. To help me see through the stormy weather."

Lavigne shared a 30-second-snippet of the song on September 13, 2018.

The song was officially released on YouTube and streaming services on September 19, 2018.

== Writing ==
The song was written by Lavigne, Travis Clark of the band We The Kings, and the song's producer Stephan Moccio. Lavigne described the writing process as "a beautiful experience". She explained she started writing the song during a tough time battling Lyme disease a few years prior, thinking her life was over. She recalled: "one night when I was starting to feel better, I had a party at my house and somehow Travis was there. I had never met him before. I found him on my piano and I just thought he was so unbelievably talented, and I asked him to finish the song with me". Lavigne further said they worked "so hard" on the song and were able to take her story and put it out in the world. She concluded, "I hope that my words in this song [...] bring you hope, faith, light, and strength and that you also are able to keep your head above the water".

== Composition ==
"Head Above Water" is an "empowering" pop rock and Christian rock ballad, backed by steady-building mix of piano, strings, synths and thunderous drums. Lavigne described it as a "spiritual experience." Lavigne's vocal range spans from low F3 to high F5 in the song. Musically the song is in the key of F major and shifts between 2/4 and 4/4 time signatures.

== Critical reception ==
"Head Above Water" received critical acclaim. Marina Pedrosa of Billboard wrote that "Head Above Water" "is a powerful, spiritual epiphany detailing the Canadian singer's journey through her battle with Lyme disease." Robin Murray of Clash complimented the track's production and deemed it a "highly personal note". Murray described the song's lyrics and production in detail: "Now, we've never been 100% behind Avril Lavigne's music, but we can't help but be touched by the way she's approached what must be an enormously challenging situation." Writing for Spin, Anna Gaca described the track as a "dramatic piano ballad of resilience". Madeline Roth of MTV Canada named "Head Above Water" an "emotionally charged comeback". Roth was impressed with the fact that the song wasn't "just metaphorical", because "it documents a culminating moment in Lavigne's years-long struggle with Lyme disease". Katherine Gillespie from Paper wrote that "Head Above Water" is a "heavy piano ballad about just that: trying to stay alive."

Lindsay Elizabeth of Faithwire gave the song a positive review, calling it a "powerful worship ballad". Elizabeth further praised that "Lavigne details her relationship with God, and how He saved her when she thought she was at the end of her life." Michael Foust of Christian Headlines described the song as a "God-centric song" that even could be labeled "praise and worship", while Maria Sherman of Jezebel considered the song's nature as "dramatic Christian rock vibes" and compared it to Rachel Platten's 2015 single "Fight Song".

== Commercial performance ==
In the United States, "Head Above Water" debuted at number 64 on the Billboard Hot 100 with 33,000 digital downloads sold and 3.2 million US streams, It was Lavigne's 20th entry on the Hot 100 chart, It also debuted at number 2 on the US Billboard Christian Songs and stayed on the chart for 26 weeks and number 24 on the US Adult Top 40 Billboard and number 41 on the US Christian Songs Billboard, The single was certified RIAA Platinum in the US with 1 million equivalent units and digital copies sold. In Canada, "Head Above Water" debuted at number 37 on the Billboard Canadian Hot 100 and on the Canada AC Billboard at number 5, and also charted on the Canada Hot AC Billboard at number 10, and charted at number 39 on the Canada CHR/Top 40 Billboard. The single was certified Music Canada 2×Platinum with 160,000 equivalent units and digital copies sold.

In the United Kingdom, "Head Above Water" debuted at number 84 on the UK Singles chart and also charted on the UK Indie OCC chart at number 16, in Japan the song debuted at number 42 on the Japan Hot 10, and also debuted on the Japan Oricon Digital Single chart at number 29 with 4,206 copies sold. In Australia, the song debuted at number 75 on the Australia ARIA, and also charted at number 12 on the Singapore RIAS, while in Spain the song charted at number 28 on the Spain Physical/Digital Songs (PROMUSICAE). In Brazil the song charted at number 1 on iTunes Song Chart, it was certified Pro-Música Brasil Platinum with 40,000 units and digital copies sold.

== Alternate version ==
On August 30, 2019, nearly a year after the song's release, a new version was released featuring Travis Clark of the band We the Kings, who helped write the original version. This version features "heavenly harmonies and adds to the emotion of the already heartstring-tugging melody".

== Music video ==
Directed by Elliott Lester, the official music video for "Head Above Water" was released on September 27, 2018, to coincide with Lavigne's 34th birthday. The music video ends with a message to join Lavigne's namesake foundation, which supports Lyme disease prevention, treatment and research. The music video was premiered on Entertainment Tonight's official Facebook page. As of August 2020, the music video reached 100 million views on YouTube.

=== Synopsis ===
The video features Lavigne walking on Reynisfjara in Vík í Mýrdal, Iceland. She is wearing a white dress (said to symbolize purity) and holding a lantern (possibly to symbolize the Word of God). Lavigne is shown standing in Hálsanefshellir Cave, walking toward the ocean, sitting on the beach, and running up a cliff before she is shown in the water, sinking, and after a fruitless struggle, she appears to be dead. However, she resumes her fight, this time with more luck, and eventually she surfaces. The video ends with an urge to join The Avril Lavigne Foundation, Lavigne's organization dedicated to treating and preventing Lyme disease.

== Live performances ==
Following Lavigne's recovery from Lyme disease, the song was performed several times by the singer. Lavigne gave the first performance of the song on Jimmy Kimmel Live! on September 12, 2018, and aired through television on September 26, 2018. On October 15, Lavigne released a new live performance of the song on Honda Stage on her YouTube channel from a partnership between iHeart Radio and Honda. On November 19, Lavigne performed the song on Dancing with the Stars (The Finale) for Alexis & Alan's freestyle. On February 13, 2019, she performed the song on The Tonight Show Starring Jimmy Fallon. On February 15, 2019, Lavigne performed the song on Good Morning America. On February 18, 2019, Lavigne performed the song on Live with Kelly and Ryan. On March 5, 2019, she performed the song on The Talk (talk show). Lavigne also performed the single on Japanese morning show Sukkiri on April 2, 2019 and among a medley during 2019 Radio Disney Music Awards on June 16, 2019.

The song was performed on every concert of the 2019 Head Above Water Tour and Lavigne also performed it live from her home during a couple livestreams throughout May and June 2020 to promote "We Are Warriors", that was released in support of the frontline workers during the COVID-19 pandemic.

== Credits and personnel ==
Credits and personnel adapted from Tidal.

- Avril Lavigne – lead vocals, songwriting
- Stephan Moccio – production, songwriting, vocal production, piano, keyboards, backing vocals
- Travis Clark – songwriting
- Kylen Deporter – record engineering assistance, backing vocals
- Chad Kroeger – vocal producer
- Chris Baseford – vocal production, record engineering, drum programming
- Jay Paul Bicknell – additional production, record engineering, drum programming
- John Hanes – record engineering
- Aaron Sterling – drums, additional record engineering
- Serban Ghenea – mixing engineering
- Jonathan Martin Berry – guitar
- Paul Bushnell – bass guitar
- Kevin Fox – cello
- Vanessa Freebairn-Smith – cello
- Will Quinnell – mastering
- Chris Gehringer – mastering engineering

== Charts ==
=== Weekly charts ===
Weekly chart performance for "Head Above Water"
Chart (2018–2019)	Peak position
Australia (ARIA)	75
Austria (Ö3 Austria Top 40)	30
Belgium (Ultratip Bubbling Under Flanders)	35
Belgium (Ultratip Bubbling Under Wallonia)	35
Canada Hot 100 (Billboard)	37
Canada AC (Billboard)	5
Canada CHR/Top 40 (Billboard)	39
Canada Hot AC (Billboard)	10
Croatia (HRT)	82
Czech Republic Airplay (ČNS IFPI)	8
Czech Republic Singles Digital (ČNS IFPI)	93
Euro Digital Songs (Billboard)	13
France Downloads (SNEP)	58
Germany (GfK)	69
Greece Digital Songs (IFPI Greece)	95
Hungary (Rádiós Top 40)	32
Hungary (Single Top 40)	5
Ireland (IRMA)	93
Italy (FIMI)	97
Japan Hot 100 (Billboard)	42
Lebanon (Lebanese Top 20)	16
Malaysia (RIM)	14
New Zealand Hot Singles (RMNZ)	21
Scottish Singles Sales (Official Charts)	21
Singapore (RIAS)	12
Slovakia Singles Digital (ČNS IFPI)	94
Spain Physical/Digital Songs (PROMUSICAE)	28
Switzerland (Schweizer Hitparade)	36
UK Singles (Official Charts)	84
UK Indie (Official Charts)	16
US Billboard Hot 100	64
US Adult Pop Airplay (Billboard)	24
US Hot Christian Songs (Billboard)	2
US Christian Airplay (Billboard)	41

=== Year-end charts ===
2018 year-end chart performance for "Head Above Water"
Chart (2018)	Position
UK Cross Rhythms Annual Chart	95
US Christian Songs (Billboard)	18

2019 year-end chart performance for "Head Above Water"
Chart (2019)	Position
US Christian Songs (Billboard)	23

== Certifications ==
Certifications for "Head Above Water"
Region	Certification	Certified units/sales
Brazil (Pro-Música Brasil)	2× Platinum	80,000^{‡}
Canada (Music Canada)	2× Platinum	160,000^{‡}
New Zealand (RMNZ)	Gold	15,000^{‡}
United States (RIAA)	Platinum	1,000,000^{‡}
^{‡} Sales+streaming figures based on certification alone.

== Release history ==
Release dates and formats for "Head Above Water"
Region	Date	Format(s)	Version	Label	Ref.
Various	September 19, 2018	Digital download; streaming	Original	BMG	
Italy	September 21, 2018	Radio airplay	Original	BMG	
Canada	October 8, 2018	Christian adult contemporary radio; Christian contemporary hit radio; Christian hot adult contemporary radio; Christian radio	Original	BMG	
United States	October 8, 2018	Adult contemporary radio; hot adult contemporary radio; modern adult contemporary radio	Original	BMG	
Various	August 30, 2019	Digital download; streaming	Remix	BMG	
