= Take a Girl Like You (disambiguation) =

Take a Girl Like You is a 1960 comic novel by Kingsley Amis.

Take a Girl Like You may also refer to:

- Take a Girl Like You (film), a 1970 British comedy film, based on the novel
- Take a Girl Like You (TV series), a 2000 British television comedy series, adapted from the novel
- "Take a Girl Like You" (song), a 1970 song by The Foundations
