= The Best Damn Tour =

2008 concert tour by Avril Lavigne

- World tour by Avril Lavigne
- Promotional poster for the tour
- Location: Asia; Europe; North America
- Associated album: The Best Damn Thing
- Start date: March 5, 2008
- End date: October 6, 2008
- Legs: 4
- No. of shows: 110

Avril Lavigne concert chronology
- The Best Damn Thing Promotional Tour (2007); The Best Damn Tour (2008); Black Star Tour (2011–2012)

The Best Damn Tour was the third concert tour by Canadian recording artist Avril Lavigne. Supporting her third studio album, The Best Damn Thing (2007), the tour played over 100 concerts in North America, Europe and Asia. The trek was recorded at the Air Canada Centre in Toronto for a live DVD set entitled, The Best Damn Tour: Live in Toronto.

== Background ==
The tour was announced on November 6, 2007. Lavigne performed a private concert at the West Hollywood nightclub Whisky a Go Go, where she announced her tour produced by Live Nation. The singer stated the tour would be "bright" and "colorful" in contrast to her previous shows. Lavigne told the press she felt her previous tours were "stagnant" and "dark". She continued to say she wanted her upcoming trek to be a big flashy production, with a party theme. She would also attempt to sing her latest single, "Girlfriend", in different languages. Commenting on her tour announcement, Lavigne elaborated:

"We finally get to go out [on tour] after a year of promo, a lot of hard work, so I'm excited to go out and play live. There's gonna be dancing; it's going to be really upbeat. I'm taking my show to the next level. It's still gonna be very me, and rock-influenced … but it's also gonna be diverse. It's going to open with a bang and dancers, and in the middle of the set [we're] coming down and doing acoustic stuff and me performing by myself. Being that it's my third album, I feel like I'm a lot better now. And I've got, like, 10 singles to play now, which makes it so much easier and so much better. When you play the hits onstage, it's the most exciting part of the show. And I have more to work with now … I have slower songs, songs like 'Sk8er Boi' and 'Girlfriend,' which are more upbeat. There's a lot to it. It's definitely not going to be boring."

The tour premiered in Victoria, British Columbia on March 5, 2008. On the same day, Kohl's launched Lavigne's clothing line, Abbey Dawn. It ended in Beijing; she was the first western artist to do a full tour in China. The tour faced slight controversy when the political group, the Pan-Malaysian Islamic Party protested the concert. The group felt that Lavigne's "punk" image was not suitable for children and was not appropriate during Merdeka (Independence Day). The concert was initially cancelled but resumed according to plan a few days later. The tour faced additional troubles when Lavigne was forced to cancel the remaining nine shows on her North American leg. The singer cited laryngitis for the cancellations while news outlets cited poor ticket sales. The singer posted an apology on her website and stated if possible, she would make the dates.

== Critical reception ==
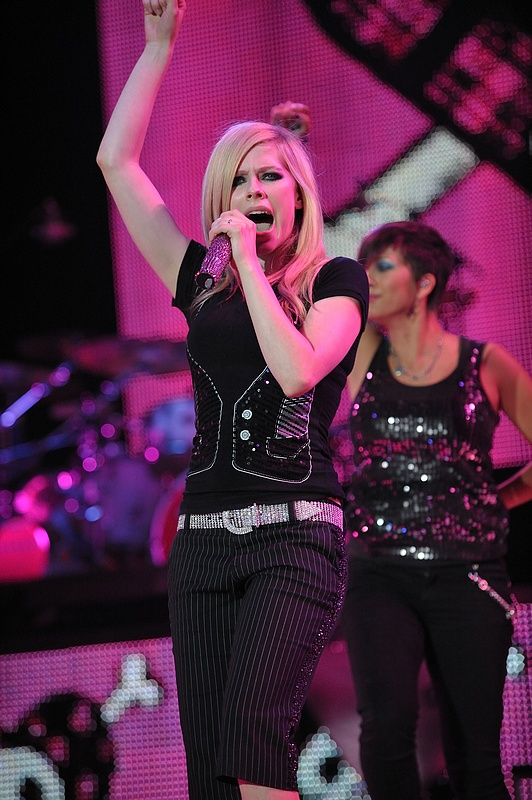
Lavigne performing in Amsterdam, Netherlands.

The tour received mixed reviews from music critics in the United States and Canada. Mike Devlin (Times Colonist) gave the premiere concert in Victoria, British Columbia two and a half out of five stars. He says, "Granted, it was the opening night of her world tour—which includes 15 dates in Canada—but the so-billed Best Damn Tour wasn’t even the Somewhat OK Damn Tour; it was just plain disappointing. And with tickets in the range of $60, the 75-minute concert clocked in just shy of one dollar per minute. Methinks some parents are feeling the sting right about now". Mike Ross (Jam!) gave the show at Rexall Place three and a half out of five stars. He explains, "I had the knives out last night, but was sadly disappointed that the show at Rexall Place wasn't as bad as I expected it to be. There is precedent: Last time through town, back in ought-five, Lavigne couldn't rock, couldn't sing and couldn't communicate with an audience".

Jason MacNeil (Jam!) felt the show at the Air Canada Centre was one of the best concerts in 2008. He elaborates, "However, when Lavigne strapped on a guitar, as she did during 'My Happy Ending', she appeared to be in her comfort zone, strumming along as hordes of glowsticks and camera flashes dotted the arena. Later on when she sat behind a pink piano for 'When You're Gone', she looked quite at ease". Miriam Ramierez (The Monitor) gave a positive review of the show at the Dodge Arena. She writes, "The excitement was hard to contain and any inkling of a struggling tour was put in the backburner here in the Rio Grande Valley. These kids were ready to party no matter what. I tried so hard to nit pick-tried so hard to find any slip up. And any which way she sang it was on point, full of energy (genuine or not) and super entertaining".

== Synopsis ==
The concert starts off with an anonymous source spraying "Avril" on the screen in black graffiti, and then is colored in with a bright pink. When its fully colored, pink lights shine, stars flash on the screen, and her back up dancers run on with pink flags displaying the logo of her third album. A short instrumental of "Girlfriend" plays, as the flags are waved across the stage. Lavigne comes up on an elevator to perform "Girlfriend". Lavigne briefly talks to the audience, and introduces the next track I Can Do Better. Lavigne introduces her band and dancers during "Everything Back But You". Throughout the concert, Lavigne plays acoustic and electric guitar, drums and piano. A selection of tracks include "Sk8er Boi", "My Happy Ending", "When You're Gone", and the remix of "Girlfriend" featuring Lil' Mama.

== Commercial performance ==
The Best Damn Tour was one of the most successful tours by Avril Lavigne. It went very well in Europe and Canada, where more than 150,000 tickets were purchased for both legs. In United Kingdom 50,000 tickets were sold, and $2,666,258 grossed. The concert in London had the largest audience of the European leg. In Canada, an extra concert was added in Toronto in August 2008. In Japan, beyond two concerts held at Yoyogi National Gymnasium, Avril played for 45,000 fans at Tokyo Dome, one of the biggest stadiums in the country. Although the tour wasn't so successful in the United States at first, on the second leg, joined with the Jonas Brothers, 160,000 tickets were purchased, with an average of $861,599 grossed per concert.

== Broadcast and recordings ==
Avril Lavigne: The Best Damn Tour – Live in Toronto was recorded in Toronto, Ontario, Canada, on April 7, 2008, and released on DVD on 5 September of that year. It was certified Gold in countries such as Argentina, Canada and the U.S. and Silver in the UK.

== Opening acts ==
- Boys Like Girls (North America—Leg 1)
- Jonas Brothers (Europe, select dates) (North America—Leg 2, select dates)
- PBH Club (Leoben)
- Demi Lovato (North America—Leg 2, select dates)
- Duke Squad (Montreal)
- The Midway State (Sudbury, Toronto)
- illScarlett (Saint John, Moncton, Halifax, St. John's)
- Silverstein (Japan)
- Ai Otsuka (Tokyo)
- Puffy AmiYumi (Tokyo)

== Setlist ==
The following setlist is obtained from the April 7, 2008 concert in Toronto. It is not intended to represent all dates throughout the tour.

1. "Girlfriend"
2. "I Can Do Better"
3. "Complicated"
4. "My Happy Ending"
5. "I'm with You"
6. "I Always Get What I Want"
7. "Best Damn Dance Break" (Intermission)
8. "When You're Gone"
9. "Innocence"
10. "Don't Tell Me"
11. "Hot"
12. "Losing Grip"
13. "Bad Reputation" (Intermission)
14. "Everything Back But You"
15. "Runaway"
16. "Mickey"
17. "The Best Damn Thing"
18. "I Don't Have to Try"
19. "He Wasn't"

Encore

20. "Girlfriend" (Dr. Luke Remix)
21. "Sk8er Boi"

== Tour dates ==
List of 2008 concerts
Date	City	Country	Venue	Opening Act	Attendance	Revenue
March 5, 2008	Victoria	Canada	Save-On-Foods Memorial Centre	Boys Like Girls	—N/a	—N/a
March 7, 2008	Vancouver	Canada	General Motors Place	Boys Like Girls	—N/a	—N/a
March 8, 2008	Kamloops	Canada	Interior Savings Centre	Boys Like Girls	—N/a	—N/a
March 9, 2008	Kelowna	Canada	Prospera Place	Boys Like Girls	—N/a	—N/a
March 11, 2008	Prince George	Canada	CN Centre	Boys Like Girls	—N/a	—N/a
March 12, 2008	Edmonton	Canada	Rexall Place	Boys Like Girls	—N/a	—N/a
March 13, 2008	Calgary	Canada	Pengrowth Saddledome	Boys Like Girls	—N/a	—N/a
March 15, 2008	Regina	Canada	Brandt Centre	Boys Like Girls	—N/a	—N/a
March 16, 2008	Saskatoon	Canada	Credit Union Centre	Boys Like Girls	—N/a	—N/a
March 18, 2008	Winnipeg	Canada	MTS Centre	Boys Like Girls	—N/a	—N/a
March 20, 2008	Minneapolis	United States	Target Center	Boys Like Girls	5,657 / 8,312	$195,643
March 21, 2008	Rosemont	United States	Allstate Arena	Boys Like Girls	—N/a	—N/a
March 22, 2008	Auburn Hills	United States	The Palace of Auburn Hills	Boys Like Girls	—N/a	—N/a
March 25, 2008	Pittsburgh	United States	A.J. Palumbo Center	Boys Like Girls	—N/a	—N/a
March 26, 2008	Cleveland	United States	Wolstein Center	Boys Like Girls	—N/a	—N/a
March 28, 2008	Atlantic City	United States	Borgata Event Center	Boys Like Girls	—N/a	—N/a
March 29, 2008	Buffalo	United States	HSBC Arena	Boys Like Girls	—N/a	—N/a
March 30, 2008	East Rutherford	United States	Izod Center	Boys Like Girls	—N/a	—N/a
April 1, 2008	Boston	United States	Agganis Arena	Boys Like Girls	3,606 / 4,683	$157,428
April 2, 2008	Montreal	Canada	Bell Centre	Duke Squad	9,104 / 9,636	$472,144
April 3, 2008	Ottawa	Canada	Scotiabank Place	Boys Like Girls	—N/a	—N/a
April 7, 2008	Toronto	Canada	Air Canada Centre	Boys Like Girls	—N/a	—N/a
April 8, 2008	Kingston	Canada	K-Rock Centre	Boys Like Girls	—N/a	—N/a
April 9, 2008	London	Canada	John Labatt Centre	Boys Like Girls	8,968 / 8,968	$461,080
April 11, 2008	Uniondale	United States	Nassau Veterans Memorial Coliseum	Boys Like Girls	—N/a	—N/a
April 12, 2008	Uncasville	United States	Mohegan Sun Arena	Boys Like Girls	—N/a	—N/a
April 13, 2008	Manchester	United States	Verizon Wireless Arena	Boys Like Girls	—N/a	—N/a
April 15, 2008	Fairfax	United States	Patriot Center	Boys Like Girls	4,964 / 6,691	$218,484
April 18, 2008	Atlanta	United States	Philips Arena	Boys Like Girls	6,016 / 8,347	$171,294
April 19, 2008	Tampa	United States	Ford Amphitheatre	Boys Like Girls	—N/a	—N/a
April 20, 2008	West Palm Beach	United States	Sound Advice Amphitheatre	Boys Like Girls	—N/a	—N/a
April 22, 2008	Biloxi	United States	Hard Rock Live	Boys Like Girls	—N/a	—N/a
April 24, 2008	Hidalgo	United States	Dodge Arena	Boys Like Girls	—N/a	—N/a
April 25, 2008	The Woodlands	United States	Cynthia Woods Mitchell Pavilion	Boys Like Girls	—N/a	—N/a
April 26, 2008	Dallas	United States	Smirnoff Music Centre	Boys Like Girls	—N/a	—N/a
April 27, 2008	Selma	United States	Verizon Wireless Amphitheater	Boys Like Girls	—N/a	—N/a
April 29, 2008	Las Vegas	United States	Pearl Concert Theater	Boys Like Girls	—N/a	—N/a
May 26, 2008	Glasgow	Scotland	Carling Academy Glasgow	Jonas Brothers	4,839 / 4,839	$261,386
May 27, 2008	Glasgow	Scotland	Carling Academy Glasgow	Jonas Brothers	4,839 / 4,839	$261,386
May 29, 2008	Manchester	England	Manchester Evening News Arena	Jonas Brothers	9,938 / 11,000	$540,414
May 30, 2008	Birmingham	England	LG Arena	Jonas Brothers	9,477 / 10,000	$515,176
May 31, 2008	Cardiff	Wales	Cardiff International Arena	Jonas Brothers	3,695 / 3,800	$201,476
June 1, 2008	Plymouth	England	Plymouth Pavilions	Jonas Brothers	2,000 / 2,000	$108,192
June 3, 2008	Bournemouth	England	Windsor Hall	Jonas Brothers	4,657 / 5,662	$252,121
June 4, 2008	London	England	The O_{2} Arena	Jonas Brothers	13,535 / 15,000	$787,493
June 6, 2008	Dublin	Ireland	RDS Simmonscourt	Jonas Brothers	—N/a	—N/a
June 7, 2008	Belfast	Northern Ireland	Odyssey Arena	Jonas Brothers	—N/a	—N/a
June 9, 2008	Esch-sur-Alzette	Luxembourg	Rockhal	Jonas Brothers	—N/a	—N/a
June 10, 2008	Paris	France	Zénith de Paris	Jonas Brothers	—N/a	—N/a
June 12, 2008	Bolzano	Italy	PalaOnda	Jonas Brothers	—N/a	—N/a
June 13, 2008	Milan	Italy	DatchForum	Jonas Brothers	—N/a	—N/a
June 14, 2008	Monte Carlo	Monaco	Grimaldi Forum	Jonas Brothers	—N/a	—N/a
June 17, 2008	Munich	Germany	Zenith die Kulturhalle	Jonas Brothers	—N/a	—N/a
June 18, 2008	Düsseldorf	Germany	Philipshalle	Jonas Brothers	—N/a	—N/a
June 20, 2008	Amsterdam	Netherlands	Heineken Music Hall	Jonas Brothers	—N/a	—N/a
June 21, 2008	Brussels	Belgium	Forest National	Jonas Brothers	—N/a	—N/a
June 22, 2008	Mannheim	Germany	Mannheimer Rosengarten	Jonas Brothers	—N/a	—N/a
June 23, 2008	Dresden	Germany	Freilichtbühne Großer Garten	Jonas Brothers	—N/a	—N/a
June 24, 2008	Berlin	Germany	Columbiahalle	Jonas Brothers	—N/a	—N/a
June 26, 2008	Copenhagen	Denmark	K.B. Hallen	Jonas Brothers	—N/a	—N/a
June 28, 2008	Stockholm	Sweden	Annexet	Jonas Brothers	2,470 / 3,051	$159,040
June 30, 2008	Helsinki	Finland	Helsinki Ice Hall	Jonas Brothers	—N/a	—N/a
July 1, 2008	Tallinn	Estonia	Saku Suurhall	Jonas Brothers	—N/a	—N/a
July 2, 2008	Riga	Latvia	Arena Riga	Jonas Brothers	—N/a	—N/a
July 3, 2008	Vilnius	Lithuania	Siemens Arena	Jonas Brothers	—N/a	—N/a
July 5, 2008	Wrocław	Poland	Centennial Hall	Jonas Brothers	—N/a	—N/a
July 7, 2008	Budapest	Hungary	Petőfi Csarnok Szabadtér	Jonas Brothers	—N/a	—N/a
July 8, 2008	Prague	Czech Republic	O_{2} Prague	Jonas Brothers	—N/a	—N/a
July 9, 2008	Leoben	Austria	Hauptplatz Leoben	PBH Club	—N/a	—N/a
August 1, 2008^{[A]}	Bethlehem	United States	RiverPlace on Sand Island	Demi Lovato; The Midway State	—N/a	—N/a
August 2, 2008	Saratoga Springs	United States	Saratoga Performing Arts Center	Demi Lovato; The Midway State	19,672 / 25,087	$750,248
August 3, 2008^{[B]}	Toms River	United States	TR North Campus	Demi Lovato; The Midway State	—N/a	—N/a
August 5, 2008	Sudbury	Canada	Sudbury Community Arena	Demi Lovato; The Midway State	4,332 / 4,400	$224,312
August 6, 2008	Toronto	Canada	Molson Amphitheatre	Demi Lovato; The Midway State	12,500 / 12,500	$429,580
August 8, 2008	Saint John	Canada	Harbour Station	illScarlett	3,855 / 4,283	$194,089
August 9, 2008	Moncton	Canada	Moncton Coliseum	illScarlett	3,702 / 4,324	$187,414
August 10, 2008	Halifax	Canada	Halifax Metro Centre	illScarlett	6,297 / 7,735	$313,627
August 12, 2008	St. John's	Canada	Mile One Centre	illScarlett	11,475 / 12,249	$577,039
August 13, 2008	St. John's	Canada	Mile One Centre	illScarlett	11,475 / 12,249	$577,039
August 29, 2008	Kuala Lumpur	Malaysia	Stadium Merdeka	—N/a	—N/a	—N/a
September 1, 2008	Seoul	South Korea	Melon-AX Hall	—N/a	—N/a	—N/a
September 3, 2008	Quezon City	Philippines	Araneta Coliseum	—N/a	—N/a	—N/a
September 5, 2008	Taipei	Taiwan	Nangang Exhibition Hall	—N/a	—N/a	—N/a
September 7, 2008	Singapore		Singapore Indoor Stadium	—N/a	—N/a	—N/a
September 10, 2008	Hamamatsu	Japan	Hamamatsu Arena	Silverstein	—N/a	—N/a
September 11, 2008	Niigata	Japan	Toki Messe	Silverstein	—N/a	—N/a
September 13, 2008	Tokyo	Japan	Yoyogi National Gymnasium	Ai Otsuka	—N/a	—N/a
September 14, 2008	Tokyo	Japan	Yoyogi National Gymnasium	Ai Otsuka	—N/a	—N/a
September 16, 2008	Tokyo	Japan	Tokyo Dome	Puffy AmiYumi	—N/a	—N/a
September 17, 2008	Nagoya	Japan	Nippon Gaishi Hall	Silverstein	—N/a	—N/a
September 18, 2008	Nagoya	Japan	Nippon Gaishi Hall	Silverstein	—N/a	—N/a
September 20, 2008	Osaka	Japan	Intex Osaka	Silverstein	—N/a	—N/a
September 21, 2008	Osaka	Japan	Intex Osaka	Silverstein	—N/a	—N/a
September 22, 2008	Fukuoka	Japan	Marine Messe Fukuoka	Silverstein	—N/a	—N/a
September 24, 2008	Hiroshima	Japan	Hiroshima Sun Plaza	Silverstein	—N/a	—N/a
September 26, 2008	Macau		Venetian Arena	—N/a	—N/a	—N/a
September 28, 2008^{[C]}	Guangzhou	China	Guangzhou Gymnasium	—N/a	—N/a	—N/a
September 30, 2008	Chongqing	China	Chongqing Olympic Sports Center	—N/a	—N/a	—N/a
October 2, 2008^{[D]}	Lijiang	China	Shuhe Sanduo Plaza	—N/a	—N/a	—N/a
October 4, 2008	Shanghai	China	Shanghai Indoor Stadium	—N/a	—N/a	—N/a
October 6, 2008	Beijing	China	Wukesong Arena	—N/a	—N/a	—N/a
Total					291,418 / 327,262 (89%)	$13,208,875

Festivals and other miscellaneous performances
^{A} This concert was a part of "Musikfest"
^{B} This concert was a part of "Toms River Fest"
^{C} This concert was a part of the "Shenzhen International Summer Music Festival"
^{D} This concert was a part of the "Lijiang Snow Mountain Music Festival"

Cancellations and rescheduled shows

April 30, 2008	San Diego	Cox Arena at Aztec Bowl	Unknown
May 2, 2008	Phoenix, Arizona	Cricket Wireless Pavilion	Unknown
May 3, 2008	Anaheim, California	Honda Center	Unknown
May 4, 2008	Los Angeles	Gibson Amphitheatre	Unknown
May 6, 2008	Santa Barbara, California	Santa Barbara Bowl	Unknown
May 7, 2008	San Jose	HP Pavilion at San Jose	Unknown
May 9, 2008	Spokane, Washington	Spokane Veterans Memorial Arena	Unknown
May 10, 2008	Everett, Washington	Comcast Arena	Unknown
June 15, 2008	Badalona, Spain	Palau Municipal d'Esports de Badalona	Unknown
June 30, 2008	Helsinki, Finland	Hartwall Areena	Moved to Helsinki Ice Hall
July 8, 2008	Prague, Czech Republic	T-Mobile Arena	Moved to O_{2} Prague
September 1, 2008	Seoul, South Korea	Jamsil Arena	Moved to Melon-AX Hall

== Personnel ==
- Stage Director: Jamie King
- Assistant Stage Director: Carla Kama
- Tour Manager: Dan Cleland
- Choreographers: Lindsey Blaufarb, Craig Hollaman and Jamie King
- Assistant Choreographer: Sofia Toufa
- Production Manager: Dale Lynch
- Lighting Director: Brent Clark
- Musical Director: Jim McGorman
- Video Screen Director: William Crooks

Crew

- FOH Engineer: Jim Yakabuski
- Monitor Engineer: Matthew Peskie
- System Engineer: Matt Blakely and Evan Hall
- Video Screen Engineer: Daniel Deshara
- Monitor System Technician: Shawn Shuell
- PA Technician: Marco Giappesi, James Marcelek and Kevin Simmerman
- Drum Technician: Ian O'Neill
- Guitar Technician: Brian Kutzman
- Director of Security: Derick Henry
- Security: Matt Lavigne and Jon Zivcovic
- Costume: Leah Smith
- Wardrobe Supervisor: Louise Kennedy
- Wardrobe Assistant: Amie Darlow
- Hair/Makeup: Gabriel Panduro

Band

- Drums: Rodney Howard
- Lead Guitar: Steve Fekete
- Rhythm Guitars: Avril Lavigne and Jim McGorman
- Bass: Al Berry
- Keyboards: Steve Ferlazzo
- Vocals: Avril Lavigne, Caity Lotz, Jim McGorman and Sofia Toufa
- Dancers: Lindsay Blaufarb, Jesse Brown, Jaime Burgos III, Sara Von Gillern, Caity Lotz and Sofia Toufa
