= The Best Damn Thing (song) =

2008 single by Avril Lavigne

Single by Avril Lavigne

from the album The Best Damn Thing
- Released: June 13, 2008
- Recorded: January 2007
- Studio: Pulse Recording (Los Angeles, CA)
- Genre: Pop punk
- Length: 3:10
- Label: RCA
- Songwriters: Avril Lavigne; Butch Walker
- Producer: Butch Walker

Avril Lavigne singles chronology
"Hot" (2007)	"The Best Damn Thing" (2008)	"Alice" (2010)

Music video
- "The Best Damn Thing" on YouTube

"The Best Damn Thing" is a song by Canadian singer-songwriter Avril Lavigne, taken from her third studio album of the same name (2007). The song was released as the fourth and final single from the album only in some European countries and in Brazil during June 2008. The song was written by Lavigne and Butch Walker, and was produced by Walker. The song is a pop punk track about female self-confidence, containing a spell out of her name, in the style of an American football cheer, with each letter spelling out a different way in which a girlfriend deserves to be treated.

The song received mixed reviews from music critics, some citing its similarities to Toni Basil's song "Mickey", and comparing it to her previous single "Girlfriend". Commercially, the song failed to make any significant impact on the charts, peaking outside the top-forty in most countries. However, it achieved platinum status in Brazil, for selling over 60,000 copies. A music video for the song was directed by Wayne Isham, featuring Lavigne as the leader of a cheerleading group, wearing a pink wig whilst playing an electric guitar, and with her band. She performed the song only on her the Best Damn World Tour (2008).

== Background and release ==
After success of the first two singles from The Best Damn Thing (2007), "Girlfriend" (which topped the Billboard Hot 100, among others) and "When You're Gone" (which became a top-ten hit in many countries), Lavigne released the song "Hot" as the album's third single, however, the song didn't prove to be a success in the United States, whilst it charted very moderate in other countries. After rumors about releasing the song "Innocence" as the next single, Sony BMG announced that the title track would be released as the album's fourth single in May 2008. According to a press release, the music video for "The Best Damn Thing" would be shot soon and her older brother Matthew who made a cameo as a bass player in her "Girlfriend" music video would star in the video. The song was released as a single on CD in Germany on June 13, 2008.

== Composition ==
"The Best Damn Thing" was written by Avril Lavigne and Butch Walker, with Walker producing the song. A reviewer for About.com described the song lyrically as "a tear through female self-confidence." Musically, the song is a pop punk and glam-infused track, in which Lavigne raps, "I hate it when a guy doesn't understand / Why a certain time of month I don't wanna hold his hand." According to Sputnikmusic, "In the middle of the song, Avril spells out, in the style of an American football cheer, her name as a mnemonic, [sic] with each letter spelling out a different way in which a girlfriend deserves to be treated. Gary Graff of Billboard called its lyrical content a "man-smashing slap-down", while Alex Macpherson of The Guardian wrote that Lavigne is "chanting about periods" on the track.

== Critical reception ==
The song received mixed reviews from most music critics. Stephen Thomas Erlewine of AllMusic picked the song as a highlight on the album, writing that the song, "driven by cheerleader chants", is terrific, addictive pop song that is harder and tougher yet feel fresher and lighter than her big hits from Let Go." Bill Lamb of About.com also picked "The Best Damn Thing" as a "top track" on the album. Alex Macpherson of The Guardian praised her "confidence" on the track, calling it "obnoxious but irresistible." Theon Weber of Stylus Magazine called it "gloriously polymorphic", while Darryl Sterdan of Jam! found similarities with Lavigne's "Girlfriend" (naming it "Girlfriend Pt. 2"), calling it "another cheerleader beat, another killer chorus and another brash vocal about how Avril hates having to open her own door." Tim O'Neil of PopMatters echoed the same thought, calling it "almost as catchy as 'Girlfriend'."

Joan Anderman of The Boston Globe perceived that Toni Basil's '80s anthem "Mickey" was the model for the track, which according to her has "perky hand claps and a cocky cheer." Sal Cinquemani agreed, writing that the song features "cheerleader stomp a la Tony Basil's 'Mickey', effectively appropriating the song back from Gwen and Pharrell." Dave De Sylvia of Sputnikmusic wrote the song has "aggressive background shouts and the cheesiest of middle sections (even by glam rock standards)." Eric R. Danton of Connecticut Music was critical with the song, writing that its "thumpy beats mimic any number of Black Eyed Peas tunes." Alex Nunn of musicOMH was mixed, writing that the song shows "how inexperienced Avril remains as a sole lyricist," calling it a "bratty naivety track." Spence D. of IGN wrote the song shows "her weakness for glomming on to a particular style and beating it to death."

== Chart performance ==
In the United States, "The Best Damn Thing" debuted and peaked at number 7 on the Bubbling Under Hot 100 chart in the United States. The single experienced no physical release in the country, thus becoming the least successful single released from The Best Damn Thing (2007) there. The song experienced more success in Canada and Germany, peaking at number 76 on the Canadian Hot 100 and number 64 on the GfK Entertainment charts. However, these peaks also resulted in "The Best Damn Thing" becoming Lavigne's most unsuccessful single in these countries at that point in her career. On June 27, 2008, the song debuted and peaked at number 51 on the Ö3 Austria Top 40, also becoming the lowest peaking single of Lavigne's career at that point in Austria. The song was considerably more successful in Brazil, where it achieved sales of over 60,000 copies, resulting in a platinum certification.

== Music video ==
=== Background ===
The music video was directed by Wayne Isham in Los Angeles, California on February 28, 2008. The video premiered on Total Request Live Italy on April 4, and on the website Imeem on April 9 following a recorded introduction by Lavigne. Avril's brother, Matt Lavigne, in addition to former backing band members Jim McGorman, Devin Bronson, and Evan Taubenfeld appear alongside Avril in the music video. In the video, Lavigne wore clothes from her clothing line Abbey Dawn.

=== Synopsis ===
Lavigne plays guitar in the video.

Similar to the video for "Girlfriend", the video shows Lavigne as three distinct characters: the leader of a cheerleading group called "Team Avril", herself wearing a bobbed pink wig and a dress whilst playing an electric guitar, and herself with her band. She plays the drums towards the end of the video. In the end, she pays homage to her own video for "He Wasn't".

== Live performances ==
"The Best Damn Thing" was performed on Lavigne's the Best Damn World Tour (2008) as the second song on the setlist. Lavigne further promoted the song on Live with Regis and Kelly in April 2008, performing the song live alongside "I Can Do Better". The song was also performed on Music Station Japan on September 12, 2008.

== Track listings and formats ==
- German CD
1. "The Best Damn Thing" (album version) – 3:09
2. "Sk8er Boi" (Live MSN Control Room performance) – 3:44
- Taiwanese MCD
1. "The Best Damn Thing" (album version) – 3:09
2. "Girlfriend" (Live MSN Control Room performance) – 4:06
3. "Innocence" (Live MSN Control Room performance) – 3:51
4. "Hot" (Live MSN Control Room performance) – 3:49
5. "Losing Grip" (Live MSN Control Room performance) – 4:10

== Credits and personnel ==
- Avril Lavigne – writer, lead vocals, background vocals
- Butch Walker – writer, producer, bass, percussion, guitar, keyboards, programming, background vocals
- Deryck Whibley – guitar
- Dan Chase – keyboards, programming
- Josh Freese – drums
- Karl Egsieker – engineering at Pulsa Recordings
- Serban Ghenea – mixing at MixStar Studios (Virginia Beach)
- John Hanes – Pro Tools editing
- Tim Roberts – additional assistance

Credits and personnel adapted from The Best Damn Thing CD single liner notes.

== Charts ==
Chart performance for "The Best Damn Thing"
Chart (2008)	Peak position
Austria (Ö3 Austria Top 40)	51
Belgium (Ultratip Bubbling Under Flanders)	14
Belgium (Ultratip Bubbling Under Wallonia)	18
Canada Hot 100 (Billboard)	76
Canada CHR/Top 40 (Billboard)	22
Czech Republic Airplay (ČNS IFPI)	84
Germany (GfK)	64
US Bubbling Under Hot 100 (Billboard)	7
US Pop 100 (Billboard)	81

== Certifications ==
Region	Certification	Certified units/sales
Brazil (Pro-Música Brasil)	Platinum	60,000^{*}
^{*} Sales figures based on certification alone.
