= Sienna Guillory =

English actress (born 1975)

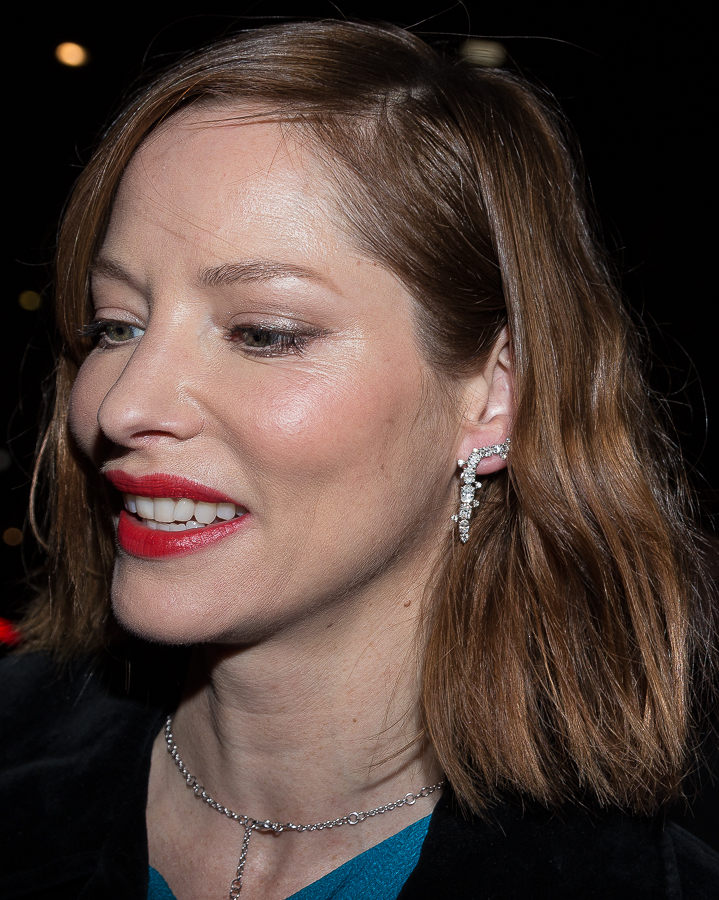
- Guillory in 2014
- Born: Sienna Tiggy Guillory; 16 March 1975 (age 51); Kettering, Northamptonshire, England
- Education: Gresham's School
- Occupations: Actress; model
- Years active: 1993–present
- Known for: Helen of Troy; The Time Machine; Resident Evil series
- Height: 1.72 m (5 ft 7 1/2 in)
- Spouse(s): Nick Moran (m. 1997; div. 2000) Enzo Cilenti (m. 2002)
- Children: 2
- Father: Isaac Guillory

Sienna Tiggy Guillory (/ˈɡɪləri/; born 16 March 1975) is an English actress and former model. She portrayed Jill Valentine in several entries of the Resident Evil action-horror film series. Other prominent roles include elf princess Arya Dröttningu in the fantasy-adventure film Eragon and the title role in the TV miniseries Helen of Troy. She has appeared in TV shows including Fortitude, Stan Lee's Lucky Man, and Luther.

== Early life ==
Born in Kettering, Northamptonshire, Guillory is the daughter of American folk guitarist Isaac Guillory and his first wife, English model Tina Thompson, who married in 1973. Her father was the son of American and Turkish-Jewish parents and born at the Guantanamo Bay Naval Base in Cuba.

Her parents moved to Fulham, London, when Guillory was two, then later to Norfolk when she was 11. At the age of ten, she went to stay with cousins in Mexico to learn Spanish.

She has a half-brother, who has the same mother. Her father adopted him. Her parents divorced in 1990 when Sienna was 14. In 1993, her father married Vickie McMillan, and had two children with her, Ellie and Jacob.

Guillory attended Gresham's School in Holt, Norfolk, where she took part in numerous school productions. She started horseback riding at the age of two. At 14, she was given a horse, which she named The Night Porter, or "Porty", after the film The Night Porter; Guillory was a fan of its leading actress Charlotte Rampling.

In December 2000, Guillory's father died of cancer at the age of 53.

== Career ==
=== Modelling ===
In 1997, Guillory accompanied a ballerina friend to the London modelling agency Select Model Management and was soon signed. She modelled to support her acting career. As a model, she worked in campaigns for Armani, Dolce & Gabbana, Burberry and Paul Smith and appeared on the covers of several fashion magazines. In 1999, she became the face of the Hugo Boss fragrance campaign, succeeding model Karen Ferrari and continuing the campaign for three years. After modelling for a few years, Guillory returned her focus to acting in 2000. She is signed to Independent Models in London.

=== Acting ===
Guillory explained that she "became an actor because I wanted to know what it was like to be other people. Because possibly I don't like myself", and later said "I hate acting, really hate it. I kind of fell into it sideways ... I started acting because I got offered a job when I was 16, and they wanted to pay me £8,000, and we'd always lived on Family Support". She went on to say that her frustration with later film roles left her bitter, but after seeing Helen Mirren on stage she was inspired again.

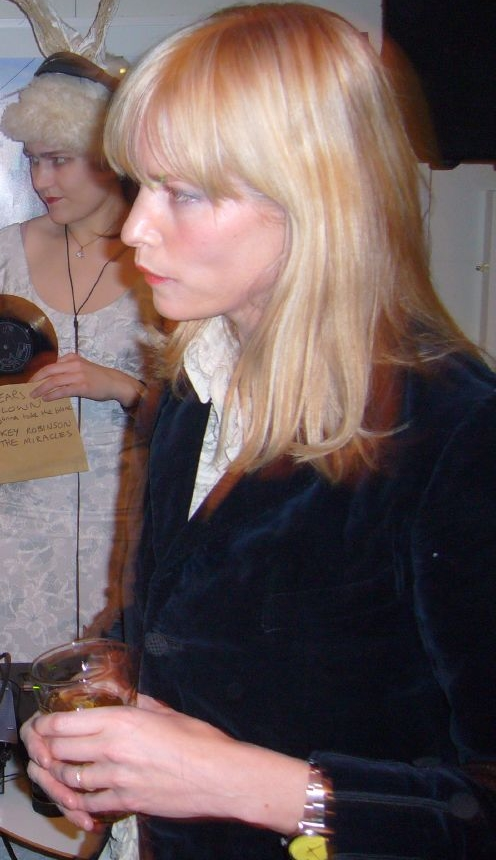
Guillory in 2007

In 1993, Guillory made her screen debut in Riders, a TV adaptation of Jilly Cooper's novel of the same name, for which the casting directors needed a young actress who was able to ride a horse. Her performance landed her another small role in the miniseries The Buccaneers, opposite Mira Sorvino.

Before becoming a model to support her acting career, Guillory waited tables at a club. In an interview in 2000, she said about the experience "Supporting my acting habit with waitressing was probably the most useful thing I've done." During her time as a model, she studied acting at the New World School of the Arts and the Paris Conservatoire, also taking small television and film roles in The Future Lasts a Long Time (1996), The Rules of Engagement (1999), Star! Star! (1999), Kiss Kiss (Bang Bang) (2000), The 3 Kings (2000), and Two Days, Nine Lives (2000). During this time, Guillory decided to go on with her acting career because "I was so scared of going to university and being with people my own age again, having been with that tiny little sect of girls in Norfolk whose daddies were farmers and politicians, who didn't trust me and didn't know where I was coming from".

She returned to film with a more substantial role in the thriller Sorted (2000). Guillory went on to appear in the BBC production Take a Girl Like You, a television adaptation of Kingsley Amis's novel of the same name. She portrayed Jenny Bunn, the story's virginal heroine, and gained critical attention for her part in the period piece. Guillory was pleased to have played a more innocent character, saying "I've played floozies, psychopaths, assassins, crackheads... It's nice to do something with a lighter touch." The production did not fare well in the ratings.

In 2001, Guillory continued with other roles in predominantly British films, including Oblivious, Late Night Shopping (with husband Enzo Cilenti), The Last Minute, and Superstition. 2002 saw Guillory appear in The Time Machine, alongside Guy Pearce and Jeremy Irons. She was pleased to take on a larger scale film, after having worked on low-budget independent films, and compared the experience with "finding an unicorn in your sock drawer". She played Emma, the fiancée of Pearce's character, who was killed early in the film and whose death set off its main events.

In 2003, after a friend had received a script for The Principles of Lust, Guillory claims she "read it and couldn't put it down, and begged to read for the part". She was impressed by director Penny Woolcock's unconventional style of shooting, without rehearsing the actors, using raw takes and improvisational performances. For the role of Juliette, Guillory performed nude in the film's sex scenes which were filmed during the first week of filming, making her somewhat nervous. She later went on to say that it was one of her favorite acting experiences. Afterwards, Guillory had a small role in the romantic comedy Love Actually before taking the starring role in the television miniseries Helen of Troy. The series was mostly based on Homer's epic poem Iliad and focuses on the mythological life of Helen. Helen of Troy was nominated for best miniseries at the Satellite Awards.

In May 2004, Guillory starred in a new stage production of The Shape of Things at the New Ambassadors Theatre in London, with husband Cilenti. That year she also played her first big Hollywood role. She was cast as Jill Valentine, one of the lead characters in the video game adaptation sequel Resident Evil: Apocalypse. The filmmakers had searched widely for an actress to portray Jill and found her in Guillory, who had to "please not only the movie-going audience but also the gamers." She was "a dead ringer for Jill Valentine". Guillory studied the original character's movements by watching playthroughs of the video game Resident Evil 3: Nemesis. Before getting the script for the film, she had not been familiar with the video games or seen Resident Evil (2002).

She said about her role:

You always want to play someone you’re going to have fun with, someone you want to be. Jill's got everything a girl wants to be – she dresses to kill, says whatever she wants and can shoot anyone between the eyes in a 50-yard radius. She's hard as nails and she's great fun. And not at all afraid of being quite the sexy minx.

After the success of Resident Evil: Apocalypse, Guillory appeared in other film and television roles, including Beauty (2004), Marple: A Murder Is Announced (2005), In the Bathroom (2005), The Virgin Queen (2005), Silence Becomes You (2005), and Rabbit Fever (2006).

In 2006, Guillory was a lead in the ensemble cast of the fantasy Eragon, the film adaptation of the novel by Christopher Paolini; the role reunited her with The Time Machine co-star Jeremy Irons. She portrayed Arya Dröttningu, an elf princess. She had not read the novels before filming, but after accepting the role she became a fan of Paolini's work. Although Arya is a key character in the film, Guillory had little screen time and went on to say jokingly: "I've been trying to explain to friends who've seen the trailer [...] I'm like, "[...] but that's my whole part!"" Eragon was not well received by the critics, but was nominated as Best Fantasy Film at the 2006 Saturn Awards. The film grossed approximately $75 million in the US and $173.9 million elsewhere, totaling $249 million worldwide. Guillory was invited to reprise her role as Jill Valentine in Resident Evil: Extinction, the sequel to Resident Evil: Apocalypse, but could not accept due to scheduling conflicts with Eragon.

In 2007, she starred in the Spanish production The Heart of the Earth, and later in the year finished filming the horror/thriller Victims and the fantasy novel adaptation Inkheart. In Inkheart, she plays Resa, the wife of Brendan Fraser's character and the mother of Eliza Bennett's. Guillory acted alongside Helen Mirren, a friend of the Guillory family who was a role model when she first had aspirations towards acting.

Guillory was to be a lead in the television series The Oaks, expected to begin airing in 2008. She joined Bahar Soomekh, Matt Lanter, Romy Rosemont, Jeremy Renner, Michael Rispoli and Shannon Lucio in the series, which follows the intertwining stories of three families—a young couple in 1968 who have lost a child, a family of four in 1998, and a pregnant couple in 2008—who are haunted by the same spirit in their house. The television series began filming on 5 November 2007 on location in Pasadena, California. Guillory will play Jessica, the 2008 couple's neighbour, a woman who has Asperger syndrome who went to school with the husband (and father-to-be) and shares a secret with him.

In May 2010, Shock Till You Drop.com confirmed the return of Jill Valentine in the Resident Evil film franchise's fourth installment, Resident Evil: Afterlife, with Guillory reprising the role. On 31 May, Jovovich also confirmed that Guillory would return as Jill. Guillory reappears in the film in a mid-end credit scene. She returned to a starring role in the following film, Resident Evil: Retribution, as the main antagonist of the film.

In 2015, she joined the main cast as scientist Natalie Yelburton in the new thriller series Fortitude, commissioned by Sky Atlantic and set in the fictional Arctic oil settlement of the same name. She returned to the role for the show's second series in 2016, and appeared in the third season in 2018.

In January 2016 she also joined the cast of Sky One's new series, Stan Lee's Lucky Man, playing the character Eve. She subsequently returned for both the second and third seasons.

In May 2018, she appeared as the only actor, yet playing multiple roles, in the music video for Liam Gallagher's "Paper Crown". In 2023, she starred as the lead villain and billionaire Hillary Driscoll in the film Meg 2: The Trench.

== Media ==
In 2001, readers of Esquire UK voted Guillory "Britain's Most Eligible Woman" and featured her in a pictorial in the magazine. Guillory was photographed for the cover and shoot by photographer Jonathan Glynn Smith. In 2002, she was number 89 on Maxim's "Hot 100 List" of the "world's 100 most beautiful women", and in 2007 Guillory was voted number 54 at Askmen.com's Top 99 Countdown.

Guillory has been quoted as disliking the Hollywood culture, saying she does not wish to be part of it.

== Personal life ==
In 2000, Guillory began dating English actor Enzo Cilenti, and they married in 2002. The couple appeared in the 2001 film Late Night Shopping, and have continued to appear together in various works. In August 2004, Guillory and Cilenti cycled five stages of the Tour de France to raise money for charity.

== Filmography ==
Films
Year	Title	Role	Notes	Ref.
1996	The Future Lasts a Long Time	Blue	Short film	
2000	The Rules of Engagement	Denise	Short film	
2000	Sorted	Sunny		
2000	The 3 Kings	Roxana		
2000	Kiss Kiss (Bang Bang)	Kat		
2001	Oblivious	Jessica		
2001	Late Night Shopping	Susie		
2001	Superstition	Julie		
2002	The Time Machine	Emma		
2003	The Principles of Lust	Juliette		
2003	Love Actually	Jamie's girlfriend		
2004	Resident Evil: Apocalypse	Jill Valentine		
2005	In the Bathroom	The Woman		
2005	Silence Becomes You	Grace		
2006	Rabbit Fever	Newscaster		
2006	Eragon	Arya Dröttningu	Also voice of Arya in game adaptation	
2007	El corazón de la tierra	Katherine	English title: The Heart of the Earth	
2008	Inkheart	Resa Folchart		
2010	Perfect Life	Anne	aka Perfect Victims – US DVD title	
2010	Gunless	Jane		
2010	I'm Here	Francesca		
2010	Resident Evil: Afterlife	Jill Valentine	Cameo	
2011	The Big Bang	Julie Kestral / Lexie Persimmon		
2011	The Last Belle	Rosie (voice)	Short film	
2012	Resident Evil: Retribution	Jill Valentine		
2013	The Wicked Within	Bethany	Also serves as co-producer	
2013	The List	Alison Corwin		
2014	The Goob	Janet		
2014	Dream On	Lesley Richardson		
2014	High-Rise	Ann Sheridan		
2016	Don't Hang Up	Mrs. Kolbein		
2016	The Whole Banana	Denise		
2016	The Warriors Gate	Annie Bronson		
2016	Abduct	Angelica Dark		
2017	The Performance	Sarah		
2019	Nuclear	Mother		
2019	Crystal's Shadow	Angelica Dark		
2019	Remember Me	Selma		
2020	Son of the South	Jessica Mitford		
2021	Clifford the Big Red Dog	Maggie Howard		
2021	Defining Moments	Lisa		
2021	A Banquet	Holly Hughes		
2023	Meg 2: The Trench	Hillary Driscoll		

Television
Year	Title	Role	Notes	Ref.
1993	Riders	Fenella Maxwell	TV series	
1995	The Buccaneers	Lady Felicia	TV miniseries	
1999	Out of Sight	Ingrid	2 episodes	
1999	Dzvirpaso M		4 episodes	
2000	Take a Girl Like You	Jenny Bunn	TV miniseries	
2003	Helen of Troy	Helen	TV miniseries	
2004	Beauty	Cathy Wardle	TV film	
2005	Agatha Christie's Marple	Julia Simmons	Episode: "A Murder is Announced"	
2005	The Virgin Queen	Lettice Knollys	TV miniseries	
2008	The Oaks	Jessica	FOX TV Pilot	
2008	Criminal Minds	SSA Kate Joyner	2 episodes	
2009	Virtuality	Rika Goddard	FOX TV pilot	
2010	Covert Affairs	Sophie Jacklin	Episode: "What Is and What Should Never Be"	
2010	CSI: Crime Scene Investigation	Kacey Monahan	Episode: "Shock Waves"	
2013	Jo	Claire	Episode: "The Opera"	
2013	Luther	Mary Day	Main cast; 4 episodes	
2013	Believe	Moore	TV Pilot	
2015–2018	Fortitude	Natalie Yelburton	Main cast; 24 episodes	
2016–2018	Stan Lee's Lucky Man	Eve	Main cast; 28 episodes	
2020	Raised by Wolves	Mary	Episode: "Pentagram"	
2023	Silo	Hanna Nichols	2 episodes	

Music videos
Year	Title	Artist(s)	Role
2018	"Paper Crown"	Liam Gallagher	Woman

Video games
Year	Title	Voice	Ref.
2006	Eragon	Arya Dröttningu	
