= Eragon (disambiguation) =

Eragon is a novel written by Christopher Paolini.

Eragon may also refer to several things related to the book:

- Eragon (character), the protagonist
- Eragon (film), a 2006 film adaptation
- Eragon (video game), a 2006 video game based on the film
- Eragon I, the first dragon rider

== See also ==
- Erigon, ancient Thracian name of the Crna River in the Republic of Macedonia
