= Celldömölk =

- Town
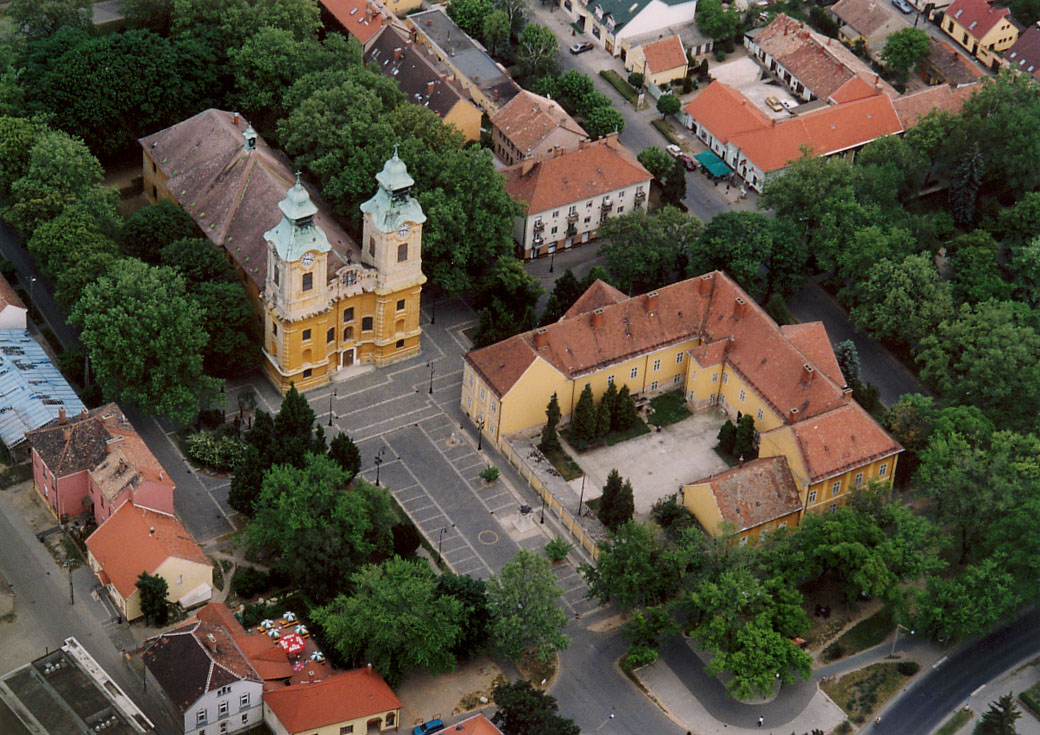

- Flag Coat of arms

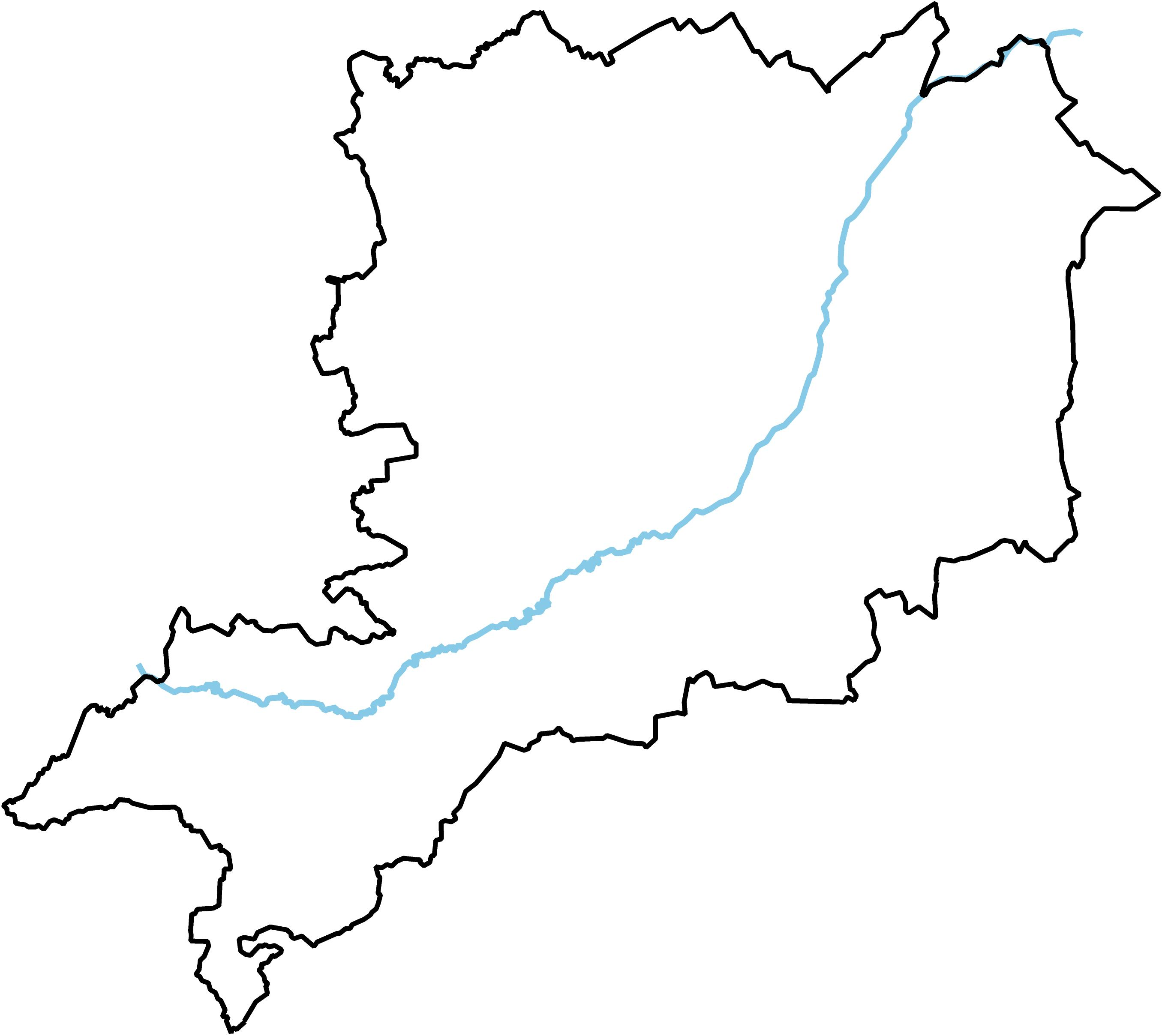
- Location of Celldömölk Celldömölk (Hungary)
- Coordinates: 47.25565°N 17.14906°E
- Country: Hungary
- County: Vas
- District: Celldömölk

Area
  - Total: 52.39 km^{2} (20.23 sq mi)

Population (2004)
  - Total: 11,478
  - Density: 219.08/km^{2} (567.4/sq mi)
- Time zone: UTC+1 (CET)
  - Summer (DST): UTC+2 (CEST)
- Postal code: 9500
- Area code: (+36) 95
- Website: www.celldomolk.hu

Celldömölk (German: Kleinmariazell) is the fifth largest town in Vas County, Hungary. Parts of the Eragon movie were filmed here. The town with 11,000 inhabitants can be found in the centre of Kemenesalja Hills.

== History ==
Celldömölk has a history older than 750 years. On the western boundaries of the town, there are the remains of the abbey built in the 12th century in Roman style.

Before World War II, there was a large Jewish community. Most of the Jews in the community were deported by the Hungarian Nyilaskeresztes Párt as part of the Hungarian cleansing during The Holocaust.

On 7 October 1944 the 2nd BG was seeking a target of opportunity bombed the railroad junction with 5 x 1,000 GP bombs. The B-17's were returning from the primary at Wien-Lobau Shell oil blending plant which was partially obscured.

== Sights ==
The Virgin Mary Roman Catholic Church was built between 1747 and 1748, while the Way of the Cross was built in 1755, with a small place with a shrine of Virgin Mary by Koptik Odó. A separate chapel was built by the abbot for the "Csodatévő Kegyszobra" as well as a treasury created above the sacristy.

The library was established on 8 February 1953. It collects materials dealing with Celldömölk and Kemenesalja region. In 1972 it was accommodated in a new library building. In 1993 the library adopted the name of Ferenc Kresznerics (1766–1832), who was a famous linguist, scholar and parson. The library has now approximately 56,000 documents. It has become famous all over Hungary, as it was awarded the title "Library of the year 2001". The building mentioned was rebuilt, renewed and redecorated and the new building inaugurated on 19 August 2007.

=== Ság Mountain ===
- Ság Mountain: A 5-million-year-old, 279-metre high (915 ft) basalt volcano, the majority of surroundings is a protected environmental area. Beside the ornithological- and geological paths established, the collection of Ság Mountain Museum helps the visitors to learn about the unique environmental, historical and cultural values of the region.
- The Trianon Remembrance Cross, which was built from donations made by local people. It was raised on the top of Ság Mountain in 1934 to commemorate the Peace Treaty of Trianon in 1920. Lóránd Eötvös carried out geodetic surveys in this area with the pendulum named after him. A commemorative statue was raised to remember the importance of his scientific contribution.

== Twin towns – sister cities ==
Celldömölk is twinned with:

- Mukachevo, Ukraine
- Neudau, Austria
- Pagnacco, Italy
- Sângeorgiu de Pădure, Romania
- Serramazzoni, Italy

== Notable people ==
- Kati Piri (born 1979), Dutch politician
- Miklós Gaál (born 1981), footballer
- Gábor Császár (born 1984), handball player
