= Galby =

Galby may refer to:

- Gaulby, a village in Leicestershire, England
- Galby (surname), an English surname
- Galby, nickname for the Galbatorix character in the Inheritance Cycle books and Eragon film
