= The Best Damn Thing =

Studio album by Avril Lavigne
- Released: April 17, 2007
- Studios: Conway (Los Angeles); Henson (Los Angeles); Monster Island (New York); Ocean Way (Los Angeles); Dr. Luke's Studio (New York); Pulse Recording (Los Angeles); Sunset Sound (Hollywood); Abbey Road (London); Ruby Red Studios (Santa Monica); NRG (Los Angeles); Sound City Studios (Los Angeles); Westlake (Hollywood); Opra Music (Los Angeles); Atlantis Studios (Stockholm)
- Genres: Pop-punk; pop rock
- Length: 40:39
- Label: RCA
- Producers: Rob Cavallo; Dr. Luke; Butch Walker; Deryck Whibley

Avril Lavigne chronology
| Under My Skin (2004) | The Best Damn Thing (2007) | Goodbye Lullaby (2011) |

Singles from The Best Damn Thing
- 1. "Girlfriend" Released: February 27, 2007; 2. "When You're Gone" Released: June 19, 2007; 3. "Hot" Released: October 2, 2007; 4. "The Best Damn Thing" Released: June 13, 2008

The Best Damn Thing is the third studio album by Canadian singer-songwriter Avril Lavigne. It was released on April 17, 2007, through RCA Records, as her first album on the label. The album represents a musical departure from her previous studio album Under My Skin (2004), which incorporated more elements of post-grunge. It was noted as her first effort to feature a wide range of producers, including Matt Beckley, Rob Cavallo, Dr. Luke and Lavigne herself, who was credited as the executive producer.

Upon release, The Best Damn Thing received favorable reviews from music critics. Some considered the album very radio-friendly, while others praised Lavigne's transition from grungey alternative rock music to more pop-punk music. However, the main criticism of the album was the lyrical content, which some found too rough or brutal. The album debuted at number one on the US Billboard 200 with first-week sales of 289,000 copies. The album also debuted atop the charts in Austria, Canada, the United Kingdom and many other countries. Alternative Press listed it as one of the albums that best represented the pop-punk scene in 2007. The Best Damn Thing has sold over six million copies worldwide and it is Lavigne's third best-selling album.

Four singles were released from the album. Its lead single "Girlfriend" peaked at number one on the US Billboard Hot 100, making it Lavigne's most successful chart single to date. The single also reached number one in twelve other countries across the world including Australia, Canada and Japan, making it one of the best-selling singles of 2007 worldwide. The second single of the album, "When You're Gone", also received commercial success, peaking within top ten in many single charts worldwide, including Canada, Australia, Scotland, Sweden, Italy and the United Kingdom, while peaking at number 24 on the US Billboard Hot 100. The third and fourth singles from the album, "Hot" and "The Best Damn Thing", received limited success on singles charts.

To promote the album, Lavigne performed at many TV shows and award ceremonies, including the 2007 Teen Choice Awards and the 2007 MTV Europe Music Awards, as well as a musical guest on Saturday Night Live. Furthermore, Lavigne embarked on a concert tour, entitled The Best Damn Tour, starting on March 8, 2008, and ending on October 6, 2008. Footage from the concert at the Air Canada Centre in Toronto were recorded and released on a DVD titled The Best Damn Tour: Live in Toronto.

== Background and development ==
Following the release of her second album Under My Skin (2004) and a world tour, Lavigne began recording material for her third album. While writing material, Lavigne was approached by Fox Entertainment Group to write a song for the soundtrack to the 2006 fantasy-adventure film Eragon. Lavigne wrote the power ballad "Keep Holding On" for the film and stated her intentions to include it on her own album, although she maintained that the song was not indicative of the sound of her next album. In late 2006, Lavigne declared in a blog post that she wanted to record more upbeat music, calling the material on her upcoming album "fast, fun, young, bratty, aggressive, confident, cocky in a playful way ... all the good stuff".

In an interview with MTV, Lavigne discussed how the writing process for The Best Damn Thing was straightforward, as she opted to write about fictional experiences that she felt were more widely relatable. She intended to have fun when recording the album, commenting, "Some of the songs I wrote didn't even mean that much to me. It's not like some personal thing I'm going through. They're just songs". Many of the sessions involved ordering take-out and drinking alcohol, with songs such as "Girlfriend" and "I Can Do Better" being written while inebriated.

== Composition ==
=== Music and lyrics ===
The songs were described as sounding like Toni Basil cheerleading for Blink-182, with Lavigne praised for her ability to combine bubblegum pop melodies with punk rock riffs. Lavigne described the record as "fast, fun, young, bratty, rock, aggressive, confident, cocky in a playful way...all the good stuff". Many of the songs on the album did not have a deep meaning to Lavigne, with her stating "It's not like some personal thing I'm going through. They're just songs." It was produced by Dr. Luke, Butch Walker, Lavigne herself, and Lavigne's husband at the time, Sum 41 singer Deryck Whibley. Travis Barker of Blink 182 and +44, recorded some of the drums for the album as did Josh Freese & Sum 41's drummer Steve Jocz when Lavigne and her party could not reach Dave Grohl.

=== Songs ===
A total of twelve songs are featured on the album. The opener and lead single, "Girlfriend", was written by Avril Lavigne and Lukasz "Dr. Luke" Gottwald, who also produced the song. "Girlfriend" is a moderately fast pop-punk, song at 152 beats per minute, performed in the key of D major. Lavigne's vocal range spans from A3 to D5. "Girlfriend" is available in seven other languages, the only difference from the English version being the chorus translated into Spanish, Portuguese, Mandarin, Japanese, Italian, German and French. The song was compared to the song "I Wanna Be Your Boyfriend", in which chants the similar verses, but was resulted in a lawsuit in mid 2007, accusing her of plagiarism. "I Can Do Better" was compared to Toni Basil's cheerleader anthem "Mickey".

The songs "Runaway" and "Alone" were compared to each other. "When You're Gone" is a power ballad with a piano and synth introduction. "Everything Back But You" was compared to "99 Red Balloons" and Sum 41. The songs "One of Those Girls" and "Contagious" were highlighted for their chugging metallic guitars [One of Those Girls] and overlapping vocal lines [Contagious].

== Plagiarism allegations ==
On May 25, 2007, songwriters James Gangwer and Tommy Dunbar sued Lavigne, her co-songwriter Lukasz Gottwald, Almo Music, and RCA Records, claiming that "Girlfriend" contains lyrics plagiarized from their song "I Wanna Be Your Boyfriend", originally performed by The Rubinoos and released by Beserkley Records in 1978. In January 2008, a confidential settlement was reached with Gangwer and Dunbar retracting their claims of plagiarism.

In June 2007, Canadian singer-songwriter Chantal Kreviazuk, with whom Lavigne co-wrote the majority of her second album, Under My Skin, spoke to Performing Songwriter magazine about Lavigne's songwriting ability and ethics. Kreviazuk claimed that the song "Contagious" was based on a track she had sent to Lavigne in 2005. On July 6, 2007, Lavigne denied the accusation in an open letter on her website. She also threatened legal action against Kreviazuk for her allegations, and Kreviazuk ultimately made a full public apology and retracted the statements.

Music critics also noted very close similarities between the introductions of "I Don't Have to Try" and Peaches' 2003 song "I'm the Kinda".

== Promotion and release ==
=== Promotional releases ===
On February 18, 2007, clips of "Everything Back But You", "I Can Do Better" and "When You're Gone" were released on AOL Music. The track "Alone" (the B-side of "Girlfriend") was made available for download on the iTunes Store in New Zealand and Australia on March 29, 2007. The whole album made its radio debut on Ottawa radio station HOT 89.9 at 6:00 pm on April 14, 2007.

Days before the release of The Best Damn Thing Lavigne was full in promotion around North America doing live performances on shows including Saturday Night Live, Late Show with David Letterman, The Ellen DeGeneres Show, Total Request Live, The Tonight Show with Jay Leno, and Live with Regis and Kelly.

On September 11, 2007, Lavigne appeared on the season finale of Canadian Idol 2007 and performed "Hot" and "When You're Gone". On the show, Lavigne made announcement regarding her tour in support of the album.

Lavigne also made her debut on the worldwide fashion website Stardoll to promote "The Best Damn Thing". Here, she created her own "paperdoll" and answered questions to her fans in a quick 10-minute exercise.

=== Singles ===
"Girlfriend", the first single released from the album, was produced by Dr. Luke and was a global success. It reached No. 1 on the US Billboard Hot 100. The single also reached number one in twelve other countries across the world including Australia, Canada and Japan. It was also the top selling song of 2007 worldwide. The accompanying music video broke YouTube records, becoming the most watched video of all time by July 2008. It holds the record as the first video on YouTube to reach 100 million views. There was also a remix of the song featuring rapper Lil Mama.

"When You're Gone" was the second single. Released on June 19, 2007, while "Girlfriend" was still strong on the charts, the power ballad became another hit in the UK and other countries. It peaked at No. 4 on the European Hot 100, was close to reaching the top 20 on the US Billboard Hot 100 and attained top twenty status in over thirteen countries. There is an acoustic version of the song on the deluxe edition of The Best Damn Thing that was only available on the iTunes Store.

"Hot" was the third single, released on October 2, 2007. The song was written by Lavigne herself and Evan Taubenfeld; it showcased Lavigne at her most revealing. The lyrics describe Lavigne's feelings for a guy who "makes [her] feel hot". The song's music video was considered her sexiest to date at the time. The single was the least successful in the US, charting only at No. 95 on the Billboard Hot 100, yet it managed to reach the top 10 in Japan and Canada, and top 20 in Australia. A version of the song was recorded in which the chorus was replaced with lyrics in Japanese and Mandarin.

"The Best Damn Thing" was the fourth single from the album. It was released on June 13, 2008, and was produced by Butch Walker. The song has a strong pop-punk vibe mixed with a teen-cheerleader theme.

"Innocence" was released as a radio single for Italy and Canada, and managed to chart in the latter.

== Release and promotion ==
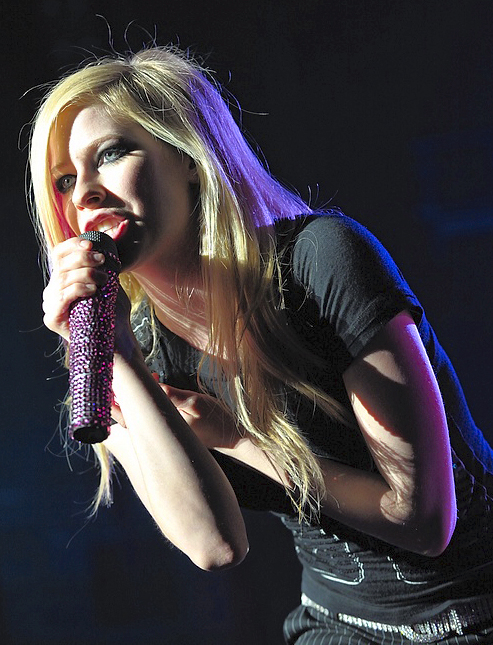
Lavigne performing in Amsterdam in 2008

During all of 2007, Lavigne promoted her album with a Promotional Tour playing some TV concerts for CBC and MTV in Canada and Paris. She also played three full concerts in Mexico and places such as Rome, Hong Kong, Russia, and played in China for the very first time in her career with a record sold-out concert in Shanghai. In Europe she played at different summer festivals. In Asia she was part of the Summer Sonic Festival in Osaka, Japan and by the end of the year formed part of the Jingle Bell Christmas Tour.

In 2008, Lavigne embarked on The Best Damn World Tour with 110 performances to support The Best Damn Thing. The tour visited North America from March to May then moved to Europe until July. The tour returned to North America for more performances between July and August, after which it travelled to Asia to conclude the tour in October. The opening act for the first North American leg of her tour was Boys Like Girls. The European leg of the tour was opened by the Jonas Brothers. Demi Lovato was the opening act for some of the dates in the second leg of the North American part of the tour. Other opening acts included Double Faced Eels and The Midway State. The setlist included songs of the new album but also older singles from Let Go and Under My Skin. A DVD with live recordings of the tour was released on September 9, 2008, called The Best Damn Tour: Live in Toronto.

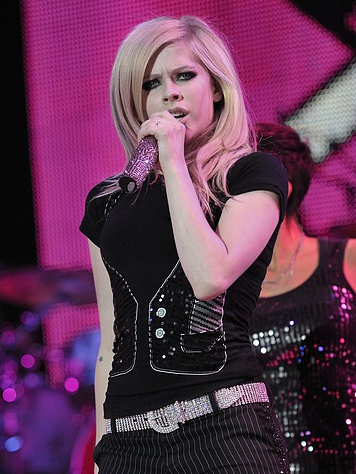
Lavigne performing in Amsterdam in 2008

Lavigne performed a small tour to promote The Best Damn Thing. Only members of her fan club were allowed to attend the shows. She kicked off the small tour in Calgary, Alberta, and played for a crowd of around 200. The Calgary show aired on television on April 2, 2007, on the CBC Network. On this show, one could see behind-the-scenes footage and Lavigne performing songs from The Best Damn Thing, as well as other shows in Los Angeles, Paris and Madrid. She also held autograph signings in New York City and Hollywood after the album was released.

The tour stirred controversy when it generated protests in Malaysia. The Pan-Malaysian Islamic Party, who led the protests, claimed "[Lavigne's performance] is considered too sexy for us" and "it's not good for viewers in Malaysia". However, the government finally gave permission for her to perform on August 29, 2008.

Lavigne canceled the last eight North American concerts acute laryngitis. She also canceled her concert in Barcelona, Spain, the same day of the concert due to a truckers' strike.

== Critical reception ==
Professional ratings
Aggregate scores
| Source | Rating |
|---|---|
| Metacritic | 66/100 |
Review scores
| Source | Rating |
| AllMusic | 3.5/5 stars |
| Entertainment Weekly | (B) |
| The Guardian | 4/5 stars |
| musicOMH | 4/5 stars |
| The New York Times | (mixed) |
| PopMatters | (6/10) |
| Robert Christgau | (2-star Honorable Mention) |
| Rolling Stone | 3/5 stars |
| Slant Magazine | 2/5 stars |
| Stylus Magazine | B |

The Best Damn Thing garnered positive reviews from music critics. On Metacritic, it has a weighted score of 66 out of 100, indicating "generally favorable" reviews. Stephen Thomas Erlewine of AllMusic gave the album 3.5 out of 5 stars, stating that the album "feels even more adolescent than her aggressively catchy-n-shallow debut, Let Go, perhaps because this is an album where Avril is allowed to run wild," calling it "as exuberant, irreverent, and exciting as any other bubblegum pop, defiantly silly and shallow, but also deliriously hooky." Alex Macpherson of The Guardian gave the album 4 out of 5 stars, calling it "a triumphant comeback", describing it as "a high-octane blast on which she is having the time of her life." Alex Nunn of musicOMH called it "a fun, engaging record", "an exuberantly fun album, one that packs more than a fair punch and puts a delightfully perky twist on the direction of former releases Let Go and Under My Skin."

Chris Willman of Entertainment Weekly and Theon Weber of Stylus Magazine gave the album a "B" rating, while Willman praised Lavigne for "providing the best darn rock & roll album teen girls are likely to hear all year", Weber described the album as an "enormous, senseless, superficial, selfish, and cocky past the point of absurdity, but it's never wrong." Christian Hoard of Rolling Stone praised the album for being "totally fearless about targeting pop radio and rather expert in its execution." Tim O'Neil of PopMatters was positive towards its uptempo songs, calling it "strong pop-punk turns", while considering the ballads "regrettable". However, O'Neil praised Lavigne for making "the brave decision to measure artistic maturity with no one's yardstick but her own." In a more mixed review, Jon Pareles of The New York Times wrote that "as an album, The Best Damn Thing is too relentless to be heard end to end", while Sal Cinquemani of Slant Magazine was more critical of the album's unexpected move, calling it "a big step back for an artist who was just starting to grow up."

=== Rankings ===
Key
| † | Indicates non-competitive categories |

| Year | Organization | Category | Result | Ref. |
|---|---|---|---|---|
| — | AllMusic | Pop Punk Album Highlights † | Included | |
| 2020 | Alternative Press | Best 2007 Scene (Emo/Pop-Punk) Albums † | Included | |

=== Accolades ===
Awards for The Best Damn Thing
| Year | Organization | Award | Result | Ref. |
|---|---|---|---|---|
| 2007 | Hong Kong Top Sales Music Awards | Top Ten Best Selling Foreign Albums | Won | |
| 2007 | MTV Europe Music Awards | Best Album | Nominated | |
| 2007 | Premios Oye! | Main English Record of the Year | Nominated | |
| 2008 | Japan Gold Disc Awards | Album of the Year | Won | |
| 2008 | Japan Gold Disc Awards | Best 3 Albums | Won | |
| 2008 | Juno Awards | Album of the Year | Nominated | |
| 2008 | MTV Video Music Awards Japan | Album of the Year | Nominated | |

== Commercial performance ==
The Best Damn Thing became Lavigne's third album to reach number one on the UK Albums Chart. The Best Damn Thing debuted atop the US Billboard 200 with first-week sales of 286,000 copies, according to data compiled by Nielsen SoundScan for the chart dated May 5, 2007. The Best Damn Thing became Lavigne's second album to top the Billboard 200, following 2004's Under My Skin. The album topped the Billboard 200 for two consecutive weeks, selling 121,000 copies in its second week. After three months of its release the album was certified Platinum in the United States RIAA for reaching sales of 1 million copies. As of September 2015, The Best Damn Thing had sold 1.7 million copies in the US, it was certified RIAA 2× Platinum with 2 million units sold.

In Canada, the album debuted at number one with 68,000 copies sold, slightly more than Under My Skin. In its second week, there was a 62% sales drop to around 26,000 copies. In Australia, The Best Damn Thing debuted on the ARIA Albums Chart at number two and shipped over 35,000 copies, being accredited Gold by ARIA; it was Lavigne's first album not to reach number one. It has been certified two times platinum.

In Japan, it debuted at number two. In its second week of release, after Lavigne's Music Station performance, it reached the number-one spot, selling 120,000 copies. This is her second number-one album in Japan. In its chart run, it sold 900,000 copies and was the third best selling album of the year, and the only non-domestic album in the top twenty-five. In Spain, The Best Damn Thing debuted at number nine, lower than Under My Skin, which debuted at number one. The album debuted at number one in over twenty countries and sold 784,000 copies in its first week worldwide. Overall, the album charted at number one in ten countries.

According to the IFPI, The Best Damn Thing was the fourth top-selling album worldwide and Sony BMG's top-selling album of 2007 with sales of over 5 million copies worldwide. The Best Damn Thing has sold 6 million copies worldwide.

== Track listing ==
| No. | Title | Writer(s) | Producer(s) | Length |
|---|---|---|---|---|
| 1. | "Girlfriend" | Avril Lavigne; Lukasz Gottwald | Dr. Luke; Matt Beckley^{[a]}; Steven Wolf^{[a]} | 3:37 |
| 2. | "I Can Do Better" | Lavigne; Gottwald | Dr. Luke; Beckley^{[a]}; Wolf^{[a]} | 3:17 |
| 3. | "Runaway" | Lavigne; Gottwald; Kara DioGuardi | Dr. Luke; Beckley^{[a]}; Wolf^{[a]} | 3:48 |
| 4. | "The Best Damn Thing" | Lavigne; Butch Walker | Walker | 3:10 |
| 5. | "When You're Gone" | Lavigne; Walker | Walker | 4:00 |
| 6. | "Everything Back but You" | Lavigne; Walker | Walker | 3:03 |
| 7. | "Hot" | Lavigne; Evan Taubenfeld | Dr. Luke; Beckley^{[a]}; Wolf^{[a]} | 3:23 |
| 8. | "Innocence" | Lavigne; Taubenfeld | Rob Cavallo | 3:53 |
| 9. | "I Don't Have to Try" | Lavigne; Gottwald | Dr. Luke; Beckley^{[a]}; Wolf^{[a]} | 3:17 |
| 10. | "One of Those Girls" | Lavigne; Taubenfeld | Deryck Whibley | 2:56 |
| 11. | "Contagious" | Lavigne; Taubenfeld | Whibley | 2:10 |
| 12. | "Keep Holding On" | Lavigne; Gottwald | Dr. Luke; Beckley^{[a]} | 4:00 |
| Total length: | | | | 40:39 |

AvrilLavigne.com digital edition bonus track
| No. | Title | Writer(s) | Producer(s) | Length |
|---|---|---|---|---|
| 13. | "Girlfriend" (live) | Lavigne; Gottwald | Dr. Luke; Beckley^{[a]}; Wolf^{[a]} | 3:14 |
| Total length: | | | | 43:53 |

German bonus track
| No. | Title | Writer(s) | Producer(s) | Length |
|---|---|---|---|---|
| 13. | "Girlfriend" (German version) | Lavigne; Gottwald | Dr. Luke; Beckley^{[a]}; Wolf^{[a]} | 3:37 |
| Total length: | | | | 44:16 |

International iTunes Store bonus video edition
| No. | Title | Length |
|---|---|---|
| 13. | "Avril Lavigne's Make 5 Wishes - Episodes 8, 9, 10 and 11" (manga series; video) | 27:11 |
| Total length: | | 67:45 |

Digital store deluxe edition bonus tracks
| No. | Title | Writer(s) | Producer(s) | Length |
|---|---|---|---|---|
| 13. | "When You're Gone" (acoustic version) | Lavigne; Walker | Walker | 3:58 |
| 14. | "I Can Do Better" (acoustic version) | Lavigne; Gottwald | Dr. Luke | 3:39 |
| 15. | "Girlfriend" (the Submarines' time warp '66 mix) | Lavigne; Gottwald | Dr. Luke; The Submarines^{[b]} | 3:10 |
| 16. | "When You're Gone" (music video) |
| Total length: | | | | 51:21 |

Japanese bonus track
| No. | Title | Writer(s) | Producer(s) | Length |
|---|---|---|---|---|
| 13. | "Alone" | Lavigne; Max Martin; Gottwald | Dr. Luke; Beckley^{[a]}; Wolf^{[a]} | 3:14 |
| Total length: | | | | 43:48 |

Japanese enhanced CD bonus track
| No. | Title | Length |
|---|---|---|
| 14. | "Girlfriend" (video) |

Japanese special edition bonus tracks
| No. | Title | Length |
|---|---|---|
| 14. | "Sk8er Boi" (live) | 3:44 |
| 15. | "Adia" (live) | 4:11 |
| Total length: | | 51:43 |

Physical limited edition and digital expanded edition bonus tracks
| No. | Title | Writer(s) | Producer(s) | Length |
|---|---|---|---|---|
| 13. | "Alone" | Lavigne; Max Martin; Gottwald | Dr. Luke; Beckley^{[a]}; Wolf^{[a]} | 3:14 |
| 14. | "I Will Be" | Lavigne; Martin; Gottwald | Dr. Luke; Beckley^{[a]}; Wolf^{[a]} | 4:00 |
| 15. | "I Can Do Better" (acoustic) | Lavigne; Gottwald | Dr. Luke | 3:39 |
| 16. | "Girlfriend" (the Submarines' time warp '66 mix) | Lavigne; Gottwald | Dr. Luke; The Submarines^{[b]} | 3:11 |
| 17. | "Girlfriend" (Dr. Luke remix; featuring Lil Mama) | Lavigne; Gottwald; Niatia Kirkland | Dr. Luke | 3:25 |
| Total length: | | | | 58:03 |

Asian limited edition bonus tracks
| No. | Title | Writer(s) | Producer(s) | Length |
|---|---|---|---|---|
| 16. | "Girlfriend" (Mandarin version) | Lavigne; Gottwald | Dr. Luke; Beckley^{[a]}; Wolf^{[a]} | 3:38 |
| 17. | "Girlfriend" (Dr. Luke remix; featuring Lil Mama) | Lavigne; Gottwald; Niatia Kirkland | Dr. Luke | 3:25 |
| Total length: | | | | 58:30 |

Japanese limited edition bonus tracks
| No. | Title | Writer(s) | Producer(s) | Length |
|---|---|---|---|---|
| 16. | "Girlfriend" (Japanese version) | Lavigne; Gottwald | Dr. Luke; Beckley^{[a]}; Wolf^{[a]} | 3:38 |
| 17. | "Girlfriend" (Dr. Luke remix; featuring Lil Mama) | Lavigne; Gottwald; Niatia Kirkland | Dr. Luke | 3:25 |
| Total length: | | | | 58:30 |

Deluxe edition bonus DVD
| No. | Title | Length |
|---|---|---|
| 1. | "The Making of The Best Damn Thing Album" |
| 2. | "Photo Gallery" |

Limited edition bonus DVD
| No. | Title | Length |
|---|---|---|
| 1. | "Everything Back But You" (live performance from the Orange Lounge) |
| 2. | "Girlfriend" (live performance from the Orange Lounge) |
| 3. | "Hot" (live performance from the Orange Lounge) |
| 4. | "When You're Gone" (live performance from the Orange Lounge) |
| 5. | "Girlfriend" (music video) |
| 6. | "When You're Gone" (music video) |
| 7. | "Hot" (music video) |
| 8. | "Girlfriend (Dr. Luke Remix) ft. Lil Mama" (remix music video) |

Japanese special edition bonus DVD
| No. | Title | Length |
|---|---|---|
| 1. | "Girlfriend" (music video) |
| 2. | "Girlfriend" (Dr. Luke remix; music video; featuring Lil Mama) |
| 3. | "When You're Gone" (music video) |
| 4. | "Hot" (music video) |
| 5. | "The Best Damn Thing" (music video) |
| 6. | "The Making of The Best Damn Thing Album" |
| 7. | "The Making of 'Girlfriend' Music Video" |

Notes

- ^a signifies an additional producer
- ^b signifies a remixer and additional producer

== Personnel ==
Credits adapted from The Best Damn Thing liner notes.

- Avril Lavigne – A&R, vocals, guitar, backing vocals
- Lukasz Gottwald – production, piano, guitar, bass guitar, electronic keyboards and addictive drums on tracks 1, 2, 3, 7, 9 and 12
- Steven Wolf – drums and additional drums on tracks 1, 7 and 12
- Travis Barker – drums on tracks 2, 3, 9 and the bonus track "Alone"
- Josh Freese – drums on tracks 4 and 5
- Butch Walker – production, acoustic and electric guitars, bass guitar, background vocals and percussion on tracks 4, 5 and 6
- Deryck Whibley – production, electric guitar and bass guitar on tracks 4, 10 and 11
- Dan Chase – electronic keyboards on track 4
- Kenny Aronoff – drums on track 6
- Rob Cavallo – production on track 8
- Matt Beckley – additional production on tracks 1, 2, 3, 7, 9, 12 and engineering on tracks 1, 3, 7, 9
- Jamie Muhoberac – electronic keyboards and piano on track 8
- Tim Pierce – guitars on track 8
- Rob Mathes – piano, bass, guitar, synthesizers and strings on track 5
- Greg Suran – guitars on track 8
- Paul Bushnell – bass guitar on track 8
- Abe Laboriel, Jr. – drums on track 8
- Steve Jocz – drums on tracks 10 and 11
- Chris Chaney – bass guitar on track 11
- David Campbell — string arrangements on track 8
- Larry Corbett – cello on track 12
- Cyan Wilson – viola on track 12
- Jonathan Gillespie – inspiration on track 4
- Serban Ghenea – mixing engineer on track 1, 3, and 9
- John Hanes – engineer on track 1, 3, and 9
- Chris Lord-Alge – mixing engineer on track 2, 4–6, 8 and 12

== Charts ==
=== Weekly charts ===
Weekly chart performance for The Best Damn Thing
| Chart (2007) | Peak position |
|---|---|
| Australian Albums (ARIA) | 2 |
| Austrian Albums (Ö3 Austria) | 1 |
| Belgian Albums (Ultratop Flanders) | 9 |
| Belgian Albums (Ultratop Wallonia) | 4 |
| Canadian Albums (Billboard) | 1 |
| Danish Albums (Hitlisten) | 5 |
| Dutch Albums (Album Top 100) | 8 |
| European Albums (Billboard) | 1 |
| Finnish Albums (Suomen virallinen lista) | 8 |
| French Albums (SNEP) | 3 |
| German Albums (Offizielle Top 100) | 1 |
| Greek Albums (IFPI) | 1 |
| Hungarian Albums (MAHASZ) | 7 |
| Irish Albums (IRMA) | 1 |
| Italian Albums (FIMI) | 1 |
| Japanese Albums (Oricon) (Note: The regular edition peaked at number 135 on the Japanese chart, while the special edition peaked at number one and the Japanese limited edition peaked at number fifteen.) | 1 |
| Mexican Albums (Top 100 Mexico) | 1 |
| New Zealand Albums (RMNZ) | 2 |
| Norwegian Albums (VG-lista) | 18 |
| Polish Albums (ZPAV) | 4 |
| Portuguese Albums (AFP) | 9 |
| Scottish Albums (Official Charts) | 1 |
| South African Albums (RISA) | 6 |
| Spanish Albums (Promusicae) | 9 |
| Swedish Albums (Sverigetopplistan) | 6 |
| Swiss Albums (Schweizer Hitparade) | 2 |
| Taiwanese Albums (Five Music) | 1 |
| UK Albums (Official Charts) | 1 |
| US Billboard 200 | 1 |
| US Top Alternative Albums (Billboard) | 6 |

=== Mid-monthly charts ===
Mid-monthly chart performance for The Best Damn Thing
| Chart (2007) | Peak position |
|---|---|
| Argentine Albums (CAPIF) | 7 |

=== Year-end charts ===
2007 year-end chart performance for The Best Damn Thing
| Chart (2007) | Position |
|---|---|
| Argentine Albums (CAPIF) | 19 |
| Australian Albums (ARIA) | 19 |
| Austrian Albums (Ö3 Austria) | 22 |
| Belgian Albums (Ultratop Flanders) | 74 |
| Belgian Albums (Ultratop Wallonia) | 44 |
| European Albums (Billboard) | 12 |
| French Albums (SNEP) | 38 |
| German Albums (Offizielle Top 100) | 20 |
| Hungarian Albums (MAHASZ) | 35 |
| Italian Albums (FIMI) | 21 |
| Japanese Albums (Oricon) | 4 |
| Mexican Albums (Top 100 Mexico) | 24 |
| New Zealand Albums (RMNZ) | 33 |
| Swiss Albums (Schweizer Hitparade) | 18 |
| UK Albums (OCC) | 34 |
| US Billboard 200 | 25 |
| Worldwide Albums (IFPI) | 4 |

2008 year-end chart performance for The Best Damn Thing
| Chart (2008) | Position |
|---|---|
| US Billboard 200 | 176 |

== Certifications and sales ==
| Region | Certification | Certified units/sales |
|---|---|---|
| Argentina (CAPIF) | Platinum | 40,000^{^} |
| Australia (ARIA) | 2× Platinum | 140,000^{^} |
| Austria (IFPI Austria) | Platinum | 20,000^{*} |
| Belgium (BRMA) | Gold | 25,000^{*} |
| Brazil (Pro-Música Brasil) | Platinum | 60,000^{*} |
| Canada (Music Canada) | 5× Platinum | 500,000^{‡} |
| France (SNEP) | Gold | 75,000^{*} |
| Germany (BVMI) | Platinum | 200,000^{‡} |
| Greece (IFPI Greece) | Gold | 7,500^{^} |
| Hungary (MAHASZ) | Gold | 3,000^{^} |
| Ireland (IRMA) | 2× Platinum | 30,000^{^} |
| Italy | — | 120,000 |
| Japan (RIAJ) | Million | 1,000,000^{^} |
| Mexico (AMPROFON) | Platinum | 100,000^{^} |
| New Zealand (RMNZ) | Platinum | 15,000^{‡} |
| Poland (ZPAV) | Gold | 10,000^{*} |
| Portugal (AFP) | Gold | 10,000^{^} |
| Russia (NFPF) | 4× Platinum | 80,000^{*} |
| South Korea | — | 18,260 |
| Switzerland (IFPI Switzerland) | Platinum | 30,000^{^} |
| United Kingdom (BPI) | Platinum | 491,000 |
| United States (RIAA) | 2× Platinum | 2,000,000^{^} |
Summaries
| Europe (IFPI) | Platinum | 1,000,000^{*} |
| Worldwide | — | 6,000,000 |
^{*} Sales figures based on certification alone.^{^} Shipments figures based on certification alone.^{‡} Sales+streaming figures based on certification alone.

== Release history ==
| Country | Date | Label |
|---|---|---|
| Italy | April 11, 2007 | Sony BMG |
| Germany | April 13, 2007 | Sony BMG |
| Canada | April 17, 2007 | Sony BMG |
| United States | April 17, 2007 | RCA |
