= Aimi MacDonald =

Scottish actress and dancer (born 1942)

- Born: Aimi Anne Sheila MacDonald; 27 February 1942 (age 84); Glasgow, Scotland, UK
- Other name: Aimi McDonald
- Occupations: Actress, dancer
- Known for: At Last the 1948 Show
- Spouse(s): Jimmy Mulidore (? – ?) (divorced; 1 child)
- Children: Lisa Mulidore

Aimi MacDonald (born 27 February 1942) is a Scottish actress and dancer. She is best known for her role as "The Lovely" Aimi MacDonald in the television sketch comedy show At Last the 1948 Show (Rediffusion, 1967).

== Early life and early career ==
Aimi MacDonald's Scottish father was a doctor. Her mother was English. She is the youngest of three daughters.

MacDonald went to ballet school and entered showbusiness at 14. She was a dancer, working during her teens in Great Britain and the United States. While performing with a troupe in Las Vegas, she met Elvis Presley at the Silver Slipper casino, remarking years later that he would "jam with the rest of them" and on his ability as a jazz guitarist.

MacDonald married an American musician at 17 and they had a daughter named Lisa. The marriage did not last and MacDonald returned to Great Britain, appearing during the 1960s in musicals in London's West End and in cabaret. She played in the first London production of the musical The Boys from Syracuse (Jewel Courtesan) in 1963 at the Theatre Royal, Drury Lane, alongside Bob Monkhouse and Ronnie Corbett. She recalled that she had to keep working to support herself and her daughter and that this was sometimes a struggle.

== At Last the 1948 Show ==
MacDonald came to national attention in At Last the 1948 Show, for which she had been spotted by David Frost. At the opening and closing of the show and between longer sketches, she would present short pieces on the theme of her loveliness. Her excitable, squeaky voice was likened to "a choir of frantic mice". Forty years later, a journalist referred to MacDonald as "bubble-and-squeak Aimi".

== Other work ==
MacDonald's acting on television included The Avengers, The Saint, Man at the Top, Sez Les, Shirley's World, Dixon of Dock Green and Rentaghost. Her appearance in The Avengers ("Return of the Cybernauts", 1967) was as a mini-skirted secretary, similar to her 48 Show role, whose tights were laddered as she was swept aside by a large robot. MacDonald played Wendy in the film Take a Girl Like You (1970), based on the novel by Kingsley Amis, and also appeared in the David Niven horror comedy Vampira (1974), the film version of the TV series Man About the House (1974), the sex comedy Keep It Up Downstairs (1976), and the James Bond spoof No. 1 of the Secret Service (1977). Stage roles in London included Susie in George and Ira Gershwin's Lady Be Good with Lionel Blair in 1968 and Honey Tooks in Robin Hawdon's farce, The Mating Game (1972). She also recorded a single, "Thoroughly Modern Millie" produced by Radio London Programme Director Ben Toney, which was released on Polydor in 1967 but it was not a hit.

In 1969, MacDonald and Ronnie Carroll recorded an album based on Burt Bacharach and Hal David's stage show musical Promises, Promises, and the following year she released a solo album "What's Love All About", produced by Johnny Franz. She also appeared on David Nixon's Magic Show programme, usually in a comical sense, performing magic tricks incorrectly or being the victim in the "disappearing lady" illusion.

Between 1968 and 1983, MacDonald appeared occasionally on the BBC radio panel game Just a Minute. As the only female panellist of four, she was subjected to the jibes of comedian Kenneth Williams that women should not be permitted to take part. On 10 March 1977, she appeared in BBC's television variety show The Good Old Days.

== Personal life ==
MacDonald's private life attracted interest in the press. She shared a mansion in Ascot, Berkshire with racehorse owner Geoffrey Edwards, remarking that she was "living in sin... it's lovely. I shall probably live in sin for the rest of my life". She owned a racehorse named Weep No More. Her name was linked to politicians, including Labour Minister John Stonehouse (his secretary and mistress Sheila Buckley named her as one of his lovers) and future Conservative Prime Minister John Major. MacDonald has denied relationships with either man, or ever having met "poor John Major", though she did recall Stonehouse as "tall, dark" and "very attractive to women". In her sixties, she observed that "everyone gets hysterical if I say hello to a politician today... It's very annoying to be branded a scarlet woman".

MacDonald opened a lingerie shop in west London but sold it during a downturn in the economy in the early 1990s. She returned to showbusiness, taking part in a few nationwide tours, including a 2003 production of Cliff Richard's musical film Summer Holiday starring Darren Day, in which she played the mother of former Hear'Say singer Suzanne Shaw. Reviewers referred to MacDonald as a "sixties starlet".

In 2007, MacDonald visited Uganda as an ambassador for the London charity African Revival. The purpose was to link schools in Gulu and the United Kingdom. She last appeared in a guest role in an episode of the TV series The Third Age entitled "The Grand Illusion" in 2013.
