= Ság Mountain =

Mountain in Hungary

Coordinates: 47°13′56″N 17°07′03″E

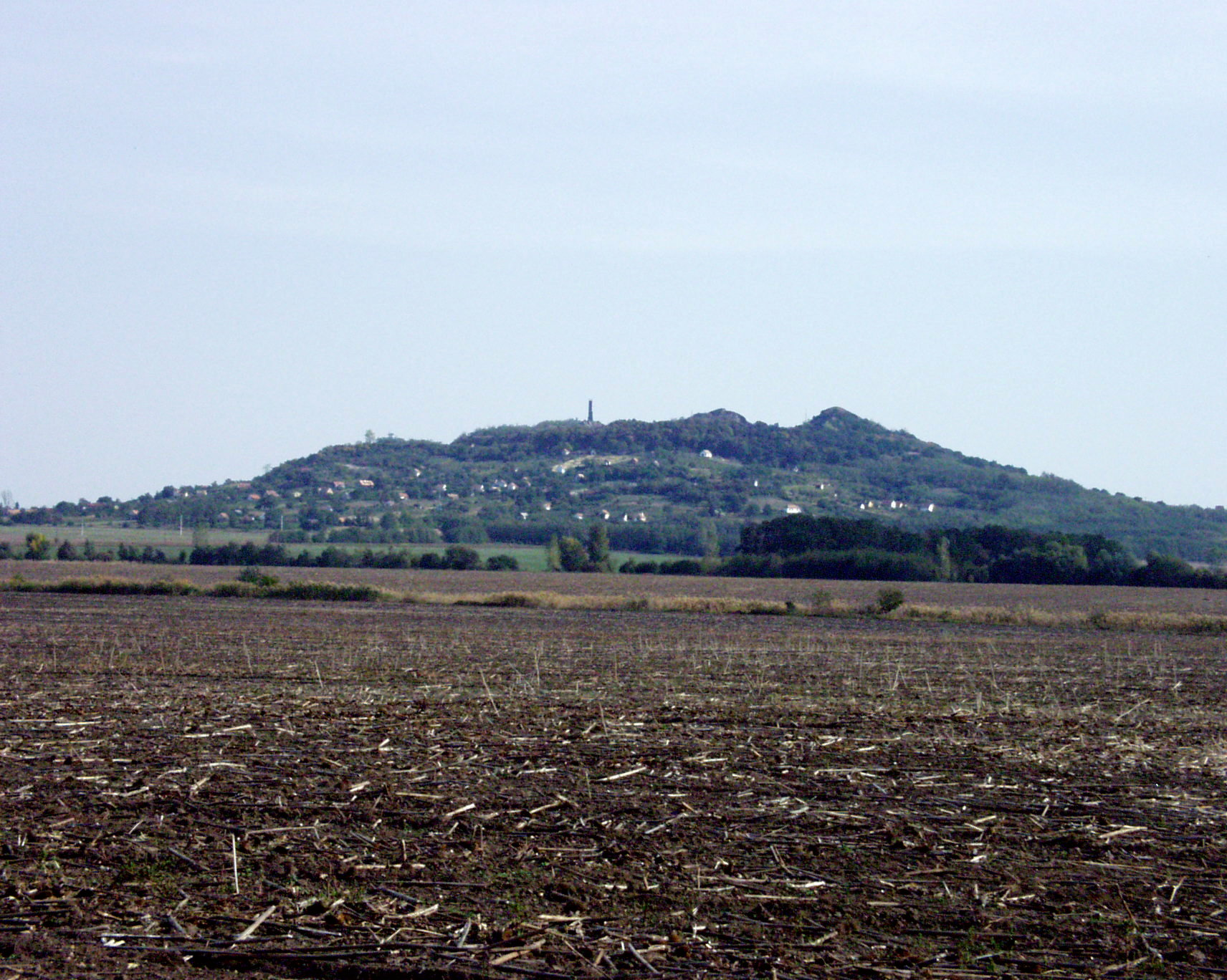
Photograph of the Ság Mountain

The Ság Mountain is a volcanic hill in western Hungary, Celldömölk that was formed about five million years ago.

It was the backdrop of Farthen Dûr in the movie Eragon.
