= Deborah Cornelius =

British actress

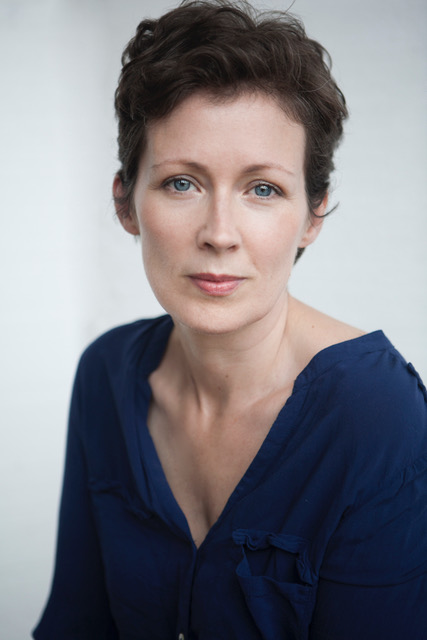
Deborah Cornelius

Deborah Cornelius is a British actor who has appeared in numerous roles in film and television. She has most recently been seen in ITV’s prime time Sunday night drama, Mr Selfridge, as the character Miss Blenkinsop, Mr Selfridge's nervy yet faithful secretary. Cornelius appeared in all 10 episodes of series one. She has also appeared in a number of high-profile TV dramas including A Dance to the Music of Time, Agatha Christie's Poirot, Take a Girl Like You, The Trail of Gemma Lang, Silent Witness, Hidden, Law & Order: UK, Wire in the Blood, Lewis, Jekyll, as Olivia in Emmerdale and A Civil Arrangement. Along with television and film, Cornelius has starred in many theatre productions, including roles in Pygmalion at The Noel Coward Theatre, London and The Fall Guy at The Manchester Royal Exchange. Cornelius is represented by Michael Ford at Hatch Talent.

Cornelius was married to Steve Brown, the British composer and record producer, who co-wrote I Can't Sing! The X Factor Musical, with the comedian Harry Hill.
