= Keep Holding On =

2006 single by Avril Lavigne

Single by Avril Lavigne

from the album Eragon: Music from the Motion Picture
- Released: November 27, 2006
- Recorded: 2006
- Studio: Henson (Hollywood, California)
- Genre: Pop rock
- Length: 3:59
- Label: RCA
- Songwriters: Avril Lavigne; Lukasz Gottwald
- Producer: Dr. Luke

Avril Lavigne singles chronology
"Fall to Pieces" (2005)	"Keep Holding On" (2006)	"Girlfriend" (2007)

Audio video
- "Keep Holding On" on YouTube

"Keep Holding On" is a song by Canadian singer-songwriter Avril Lavigne. A power ballad, it was released as the only single for the soundtrack to Eragon and later appeared as the last track on her third studio album, The Best Damn Thing, which was released on April 17, 2007. Lavigne has described the rest of the album as being upbeat and heavy in comparison to "Keep Holding On". Originally, an alternate version was to be included, but the original version made it instead.

Written by Lavigne and Lukasz "Dr. Luke" Gottwald and produced by the latter, the song premiered on radio stations across North America in November 2006, receiving positive reviews from critics. "Keep Holding On" was one of the songs short-listed for the "Best Original Song" category at the 79th Academy Awards, but it was not among the final nominees. The song was also ranked on the iTunes Australia top 500 at 403.

== Background and composition ==
"Keep Holding On"
A 24-second sample of Avril Lavigne's "Keep Holding On" song where the chorus is played.

"Keep Holding On" was written by Lavigne and produced by co-writer Lukasz "Dr. Luke" Gottwald. The strings were arranged and conducted by Leon Pendarvis, long time SNL associate with Dr. Luke. The song was recorded at Henson Recording Studios in Hollywood in 2006. According to the sheet music published at musicnotes.com by Universal Music Publishing Group, the song is composed in the key of G major and is set in a time signature of 6/8 with a tempo of 56 beats per minute. Lavigne's vocal range spans from F♯_{3} to D_{5}. Keep Holding On is a pop rock song with pop influences.

== Reception ==
=== Commercial ===
"Keep Holding On" reached number two for four weeks on the Canadian BDS Airplay Chart, number one being Nelly Furtado's "Say It Right". It became her highest-peaking airplay single since "Complicated" which peaked at number one for one week in 2002. It peaked at number 14 on the Canadian Hot 100, where it spent 20 weeks on the chart. In the United States, "Keep Holding On" spent 21 weeks on the US Billboard Hot 100 chart, peaking within the top twenty at 17, charting below Lavigne's "Girlfriend" which was number one that week. It peaked in the top ten on the Hot Adult Top 40 Tracks format chart. This feat is particularly impressive considering no official promotional music video was made.

It was not released in most of Europe, although it got to 9 in Slovakia, and 27 in the Czech Republic. The single was one of the first to be issued as a digital-only release in Australia, where it charted at number five on the Top 40 Digital Tracks chart. It was also certified Gold by the RIAA on February 22, 2007, and Platinum on January 31, 2008. By September 2015, "Keep Holding On" had sold 1.6 million digital copies in the USA. In 2023, it hit 100 million streams on Spotify, her first non-single to reach this milestone.

=== Critical ===
Billboard described it as a "gorgeous song" in which Lavigne seems to be "set to remain for the long term". Darryl Sterdan of JAM! described the song as "A strummed guitar, lush strings and a soaring vocal about love and loyalty". He went on to compare it to "a sweeping Alanis-like ballad". Despite this, Sterdan advises the reader to skip the track. Sal Cinquemani of Slant Magazine described the song as "sullen". Entertainment Weekly was also not impressed: "And: I will only have like 3 slow songs on the record. Yay!! Yay, indeed, given how little heart she's invested in that trio of limpid ballads, including "Keep Holding On," a.k.a. the love theme from Eragon." Stylus said that the song "ends the album for the same reason graduation ends high school: because after all that, Hallmark means something."

In an AOL Radio listener's poll, "Keep Holding On" was voted Lavigne's fifth best song.

=== Accolades ===
Year	Award Ceremony	Award	Result	Ref.
2008	SOCAN Awards	Pop/Rock Music Award	Won	

== Notable cover versions ==
For BBC Children in Need in 2011, over 2,500 children sang the song in unison from 15 towns across the UK. The 15 choirs, each representing a different BBC Local News Region made of local school children, sang live with a performance starting in the studio and then cutting between them before ending in the studio. However 5 of the choirs were missed off the performance. The children sang from: London at BBC Television Centre the studio where the main telethon was held, Glasgow at BBC Pacific Quay, Kent at the Bluewater Shopping Centre, Weston-super-Mare at The Grand Pier, Salford at MediaCityUK, Cornwall at The Eden Project, Cardiff at The Royal Welsh College of Music & Drama, Pudsey at Pudsey Market Square, Birmingham at Aston Hall and Belfast at W5. The choirs not included in the main link up were: Hull at Hull Truck Theatre, Hampshire at The National Motor Museum, Colchester at Charter Hall, County Durham at Beamish Museum and Loughborough at Loughborough University

In April 2015, The Voice Kids Philippines Season 1 runner-up Darren Espanto sung his rendition of the song on ABS-CBN noontime show, It's Showtime.

== Track listings and formats ==
- Digital download
1. "Keep Holding On" – 3:59

== Credits and personnel ==
Credits and personnel are adapted from the "Keep Holding On" CD single liner notes.

- Avril Lavigne – writer, vocals
- Lukasz Gottwald – writer, producer, piano, bass, guitars
- Chris Lord-Alge – mixing
- Stephen Marcussen – mastering
- Seth Waldmann – recording
- Keith Gretlein – recording
- Mike Caffrey – recording
- Tom Syrowski – recording
- Tatiana Gottwald – recording
- Steve Churchyard – recording
- Billy Griggs – recording
- Steven Wolf – drums, percussion
- Leon Pendarvis – strings
- Matt Beckley – additional production

== Charts ==
=== Weekly charts ===
Chart (2006–2007)	Peak position
Australian Digital Singles Chart	5
Canada Hot 100 (Billboard)	14
Canada Digital Song Sales (Billboard)	1
Canada AC (Billboard)	13
Canada CHR/Top 40 (Billboard)	3
Canada Hot AC (Billboard)	1
Czech Rádio Top 100 (IFPI)	27
Romanian Top 100	51
Slovakia Rádio Top 100 (IFPI)	9
UK Singles (OCC)	175
US Billboard Hot 100	17
US Adult Contemporary (Billboard)	27
US Adult Pop Airplay (Billboard)	3
US Pop Airplay (Billboard)	18

Chart (2011)	Peak position
UK Singles (OCC)	141

=== Year-end charts ===
Chart (2007)	Position
Brazil (Crowley)	98
US Billboard Hot 100	64
US Adult Top 40 (Billboard)	21

== Certifications ==
Region	Certification	Certified units/sales
Canada (Music Canada)	Platinum	40,000^{*}
United Kingdom (BPI)	Silver	200,000^{‡}
United States (RIAA)	Platinum	1,600,000
^{*} Sales figures based on certification alone.^{‡} Sales+streaming figures based on certification alone.

== Release history ==
Release dates and formats for "Keep Holding On"
Region	Date	Format(s)	Label(s)	Ref.
Canada	November 27, 2006	Digital download	RCA	
United States	November 28, 2006	Contemporary hit radio; hot adult contemporary radio	RCA; Fox Music	
