= Wes Takahashi =

American visual effects animator and animation supervisor

- Born: Wes Ford Takahashi
- Education: Hampshire College; University of California, Los Angeles
- Occupations: Visual effects artist and animator
- Years active: 1981–present
- Notable work: Back to the Future; DreamWorks logo

Wes Ford Takahashi is an American visual effects animator and animation supervisor who has worked for motion picture visual effects company Industrial Light & Magic. He is known for his special effects work on numerous films; his efforts includes animating the time travel sequences for all three Back to the Future films and the "boy on the moon" in the DreamWorks logo. He is the former head of ILM's animation department.

== Education and career ==
Takahashi attended Hampshire College in Massachusetts, as well as the University of California, Los Angeles, both of which enabled him to study computer graphics and animation. He began working at Industrial Light & Magic in the early 1980s and subsequently rose to become the head of its animation department. After essentially ceasing work with ILM in the 1990s, he helped to establish the New Zealand-based effects studio Weta Digital with filmmaker Peter Jackson. He has been with International Technological University since 2011 and currently works as the department chair of its Digital Arts Faculty.

Along with Charlie McClellan and Richard Taylor, Takahashi received a nomination for Best Special Effects at the 23rd Saturn Awards in 1997 for their work on the 1996 film The Frighteners. Takahashi has acted in minor roles in several Rob Schneider comedy films and served as an external art director for the 2006 video game Eragon.

== Selected filmography ==
=== As animation supervisor ===
- The Goonies (1985)
- Back to the Future (1985)
- Top Gun (1986)
- Willow (1988)
- Indiana Jones and the Last Crusade (1989)
- The Abyss (1989)
- Back to the Future Part II (1989)
- Back to the Future Part III (1990)
- The Rocketeer (1991)
- Star Trek VI: The Undiscovered Country (1991)
- Hook (1991)
- The Meteor Man (1993)

=== As visual effects supervisor / producer ===
- The Frighteners (1996)
- Dr. Dolittle: Tail to the Chief (2008)
- Tropic Thunder (2008)
- What Women Want (2011)
- Black November (2012)

=== As actor ===
- The Animal (2001) - News reporter
- The Hot Chick (2002) - News reporter
- Deuce Bigalow: European Gigolo (2005) - News reporter
- Big Stan (2007) - Bartender
