= Take a Girl Like You (TV series) =

British television series

Take a Girl Like You is a 2000 British television comedy series adapted by Andrew Davies from the 1960 novel Take a Girl Like You by Kingsley Amis. It stars Sienna Guillory, Rupert Graves, Hugh Bonneville, Robert Daws, Leslie Phillips, Emma Chambers, Ian Driver and Deborah Cornelius. It was broadcast on BBC1 in three hour-long episodes directed by Nick Hurran.
