= The Principles of Lust =

- Directed by: Penny Woolcock
- Written by: Penny Woolcock
- Produced by: Madonna Baptiste
- Starring: Alec Newman; Marc Warren; Sienna Guillory; Julian Barratt
- Cinematography: Graham Smith
- Edited by: Brand Thumim
- Music by: Andy Cowton
- Production companies: Blast! Films; FilmFour; Studio of the North
- Release date: 29 January 2003
- Country: United Kingdom
- Language: English

The Principles of Lust is a 2003 British erotic drama film directed by Penny Woolcock based on the unpublished novel The Zero-Sum Game by Tim Cooke.

== Plot ==
Paul is a struggling writer and is driving his car to a meeting at an art gallery when he is involved in a collision with another vehicle. The other driver accuses Paul of being at fault, but when he shouts back, the other driver apologises and tells him his own car is not insured, and then persuades him to go for a drink in a local pub, introducing himself as Billy.

Billy is accompanied by a young woman named Hole who is a striptease performer at the pub. When Hole has finished her performance, Billy takes Paul into a back room of the pub and introduces him to his group of mates who live a life of drugs, sex, and violence.

The film then follows Paul as his life veers between a relationship with Juliette and her son, and the debauched excesses of wild nights out with Billy and Hole and their mates.

== Cast ==
- Alec Newman as Paul
- Marc Warren as Billy
- Sienna Guillory as Juliette
- Lara Clifton as Hole
- Julian Barratt as Phillip
- Daniela Ruah as unnamed orgy character
- Mackenzie Crook as Dan

== Release ==
The Principles of Lust premiered on 29 January 2003 at the International Film Festival Rotterdam. It was released on DVD on 26 July 2004.
