= MuchMusic Video Award for Peoples Choice: Favourite Artist =

The MuchMusic Video Award for Peoples Choice: Favourite Artist is presented at the MuchMusic Video Awards to a Canadian solo artist. Avril Lavigne holds the record for most awards in this category with four.

== Winners ==
Year	Artist	Video	Ref.
1997	Sarah McLachlan	"Building a Mystery"	
1998	Celine Dion	"My Heart Will Go On"	
1999	Sarah McLachlan	"Angel"	
2000	Edwin	"Alive"	
2001	Nelly Furtado	"I'm Like a Bird"	
2002	Nelly Furtado	"...On the Radio (Remember the Days)"	
2003	Avril Lavigne	"Sk8er Boi"	
2004	Avril Lavigne	"Don't Tell Me"	
2005	Kalan Porter	"Single"	
2006	City and Colour	"Save Your Scissors"	
2007	Avril Lavigne	"Girlfriend"	
2008	Avril Lavigne	"When You're Gone"	
