= Hot (Avril Lavigne song) =

2007 single by Avril Lavigne

Single by Avril Lavigne

from the album The Best Damn Thing
- Released: October 2, 2007
- Recorded: 2006
- Studio: Conway, Hollywood; Henson, Hollywood; Ocean Way, Hollywood; Monster Island, New York City
- Genre: Pop rock; new wave
- Length: 3:23
- Label: RCA
- Songwriters: Avril Lavigne; Evan Taubenfeld
- Producer: Dr. Luke

Avril Lavigne singles chronology
"When You're Gone" (2007)	"Hot" (2007)	"The Best Damn Thing" (2008)

Music video
- "Hot" on YouTube

"Hot" is a song by Canadian singer-songwriter Avril Lavigne and the third single from her third studio album, The Best Damn Thing (2007). The song was written by Lavigne and Evan Taubenfeld, and produced by Lukasz "Dr. Luke" Gottwald. A ballad-inspired pop rock song, the song talks about Lavigne's feelings about a boyfriend, who makes her "hot". The song received positive reviews from music critics, who praised its "old-style" vibe and its anthemic nature.

Commercially, the song was more successful in Australia, Canada and a few European countries, while it was a commercial disappointment in the United States. Lavigne performed the song at the 2007 MTV Europe Music Awards, American Music Awards, on The Friday Night Project and many more. The music video directed by Matthew Rolston shows Lavigne in a more "sexy" way, with a "1920s burlesque" theme.

== Background and release ==
After the success of her debut album, Let Go (2002), Lavigne released her second album, Under My Skin (2004), which debuted at number one in more than ten countries and went platinum within one month. She spent the majority of 2006 working on her third album, enlisting blink-182 drummer Travis Barker to play drums, and cherry-picking a variety of producers (such as her then-spouse Deryck Whibley) to helm the recording sessions. One of the songs in the album, "Hot", was produced by Lukasz "Dr. Luke" Gottwald, and co-written by Lavigne and Evan Taubenfeld. Lavigne described the album as "really fast, fun, young, bratty, aggressive, confident, cocky in a playful way."

The album, named The Best Damn Thing, released on April 17, 2007; "Hot" is the seventh song on the albums track list. The first two singles from the album, "Girlfriend" and "When You're Gone", released throughout 2007. With "Girlfriend" in particular, Lavigne was accused of plagiarizing a song by Chantal Kreviazuk when writing the song, which she denied and continued releasing music from the album. In October, she released "Hot" as the third single from The Best Damn Thing.

== Composition and lyrics ==
"Hot" is a ballad-inspired pop rock song with new wave verses, as well as a "punchy" chorus, where Lavigne proclaims her lover's sweetness. In the chorus, Lavigne sings, "You make me so hot/You make me wanna drop." The song structurally takes a dramatic turn during the bridge in which she drops the persona of being crazy in love to candidly tell her lover how real and raw her emotions are, aside from the public display, "Kiss me gently, always, I know, hold me, love me, don't ever go," she sings softly.

== Critical reception ==
"Hot" was praised by critics. Darryl Sterdan of Jam! wrote that the song is "more old-style Avril—except for the steamy Alanis-style lyrics." Chris Willman of Entertainment Weekly commented that while listening to the "sputtering chorus" of Hot kick in and smooth out, it's as if she and her Let Go team, The Matrix, never broke up. Theon Weber of Stylus Magazine praised its "refined orgasm", while Fraser McAlpine of BBC Music praised its "nice new-wave verses, nice enormous chorus", calling it "anthemic and suits Avril's adenoidal rasp rather well." Alex Nunn of musicOMH noted that "Hot" is "one of the albums' three standout tracks", writing that "it really comes as little surprise to see his name attached to the albums best moments." Eric R. Danton of Connecticut Music called it "gushy power-ballad," while Lauren Murphy of Entertainment.ie named it "a well-produced, radio friendly tune that chugs perkily along without being irritating" and Danny R. Phillips of Hybrid Magazine called it a "heartfelt song."

== Commercial performance ==
The song was a commercial disappointment in the United States, debuting and peaking at number 95 on the Billboard Hot 100 chart and fell off the chart the following week, becoming Avril's second weakest single in the U.S. to date. As of July 2013, "Hot" had sold 490,000 digital copies in the US. In Canada, the song proved to be successful, debuting at number 87 and peaking at number 10, remaining in its peak position for three consecutive weeks. In Australia, the single was a moderate success, debuting at number 42, on November 25, 2007, and peaking at number 14, on December 30, 2007, also remaining for three non-consecutive weeks at the peak position. In Austria, "Hot" became her ninth top-twenty single and in New Zealand, it managed to reach the top-forty. In the United Kingdom, "Hot" peaked at number 30, becoming her lowest-charting single there.

== Music video ==
The music video for "Hot" was directed by Matthew Rolston and shot at the Beacon Hotel in Jersey City, New Jersey on 8 September 2007. The video was shot in Murdoch Hall, which also was used in several movies, including "Annie" and "Quiz Show". According to the press release, the video had a "1920s burlesque" theme, complete with girls in fishnets. "Ms. Lavigne had two personal masseuses tending to her during the shoot," the press release said. It premiered on Yahoo! Music, VIVA and MTV. The "Hot" music video debuted at No. 1 in Spain in its first week on the video download chart and reached No. 1 on the Australian iTunes music video chart too.

=== Synopsis ===
The video mirrors the lyrical meaning of the song in many ways. The video begins with Lavigne, semi-disguised in a wig, making a grand entrance into a club in a black dress, with photographers and fans alike surrounding her. During the first verse she is seen in a dark, seductive outfit with very heavy makeup. In the chorus Lavigne is seen in a shiny, green corset preparing for what seems to be a rocker show. As such, she releases her emotions only when she's dressed the most revealingly and strongly. For the second chorus Lavigne makes her way on stage and continues to sing. During the song's bridge, in which Lavigne candidly reveals her raw feelings – about his love and kiss – Lavigne is dressed in a normal, plain outfit.

== Live performances and promotion ==
Lavigne performed the track in numerous places. The singer went to the 2007 MTV Europe Music Awards to perform the track, and additionally won two awards. She also performed the track at the World Music Awards of 2007. Lavigne also promoted the track at the American Music Awards of 2007. Lavigne continued the promotion of the song, singing it live at the Dancing with the Stars, on Canadian Idol and at Friday Night Project.

== Track listings and formats ==
- European and Taiwan CD single
1. "Hot" – 3:23
2. "I Can Do Better" (Acoustic) – 3:39
- Australian and Japanese CD single
1. "Hot" – 3:23
2. "When You're Gone" (Acoustic Version) – 4:00
3. "Girlfriend" (Dr. Luke Remix) featuring Lil Mama – 3:24
- Digital download (Japanese Version)
1. "Hot" (Japanese Version) – 3:25
- Digital download (Mandarin Version)
1. "Hot" (Mandarin Version) – 3:24

== Credits and personnel ==
Credits are adapted from The Best Damn Thing liner notes.

- Vocals: Avril Lavigne
- Songwriting: Avril Lavigne, Evan Taubenfeld
- Production: Dr. Luke

== Charts ==
=== Weekly charts ===
Chart (2007–2008)	Peak position
Australia (ARIA)	14
Austria (Ö3 Austria Top 40)	17
Belgium (Ultratip Bubbling Under Flanders)	7
Belgium (Ultratip Bubbling Under Wallonia)	13
Canada Hot 100 (Billboard)	10
Canada CHR/Top 40 (Billboard)	4
Canada Hot AC (Billboard)	6
CIS Airplay (TopHit)	40
Czech Republic Airplay (ČNS IFPI)	10
European Hot 100 Singles (Billboard)	41
Germany (GfK)	26
Hungary (Rádiós Top 40)	13
Ireland (IRMA)	19
Japan (Oricon)	91
Mexico Anglo (Monitor Latino)	1
Netherlands (Dutch Top 40 Tipparade)	15
New Zealand (Recorded Music NZ)	30
Romania (Romanian Top 100)	76
Russia Airplay (TopHit)	31
Scottish Singles Sales (Official Charts)	26
Slovakia Airplay (ČNS IFPI)	25
Sweden (Sverigetopplistan)	53
Switzerland (Schweizer Hitparade)	61
Turkey (Türkiye Top 20)	40
UK Singles (Official Charts)	30
US Billboard Hot 100	95
US Pop Airplay (Billboard)	40

=== Year-end charts ===
Chart (2008)	Position
Canada (Canadian Hot 100)	42
Canada Hot AC (Billboard)	20
CIS (TopHit)	190
Hungary (Rádiós Top 40)	90
Lebanon (The Official Lebanese Top 20)	74
Russia Airplay (TopHit)	166

== Certifications ==
Region	Certification	Certified units/sales
Australia (ARIA)	Gold	35,000^{^}
^{^} Shipments figures based on certification alone.

== Release history ==
Release dates and formats for "Hot"
Region	Date	Format	Version	Label	Ref(s).
Japan	October 2, 2007	Digital download	Japanese; Mandarin	Sony BMG	
Japan	October 10, 2007	CD	Original	Sony BMG	
United States	October 23, 2007	Contemporary hit radio	Original	RCA	
Germany	November 2, 2007	CD	Original	Sony BMG	
Australia	December 17, 2007	CD	Original	Sony BMG	
