= Eragon (video game) =

2006 video game

- Developers: Stormfront Studios; Amaze Entertainment (GBA, DS, PSP, mobile)
- Publisher: Vivendi Games (Note: Released under the Sierra Entertainment brand name)
- Composer: Robb Mills
- Platforms: Xbox 360, PlayStation 2, Xbox, Microsoft Windows, Nintendo DS, PlayStation Portable, Game Boy Advance
- Release: NA: November 14, 2006; AU: November 23, 2006; EU: November 24, 2006
- Genres: Hack and slash, action-adventure
- Modes: Single-player, multiplayer

Eragon is an action-adventure video game developed by Stormfront Studios and published by Vivendi Games for PlayStation 2, Xbox, Xbox 360, and Microsoft Windows in 2006. Different versions for Game Boy Advance, Nintendo DS, PlayStation Portable, and mobile phones, primarily developed by Amaze Entertainment, were also released.

The game is based on the 2006 Eragon film, which itself is loosely based on the 2002 book Eragon by Christopher Paolini. The game was released on November 14, 2006 in the United States, on November 24, 2006 in Europe, and on November 23, 2006 in Australia in order to coincide with the release of the film. Players take on the role of the protagonist from the book and film, Eragon, and occasionally control his dragon Saphira.

The game received mixed reviews from critics. The combined sales in North America were over 400,000 copies.

== Gameplay ==
The majority of the game is taken up by third-person combat, usually on foot. At the start of the game, the player can use four "combo" attacks. Additionally, they can use three basic magic attacks: magic telekinesis (Thrysta Vindr), magic shield (Skölir), and magic fire (Brisingr). These three magic attacks can be utilised in different ways (for example, Brisingr arrows, or throwing spears in baskets magically). On the PC and console versions (excluding the Xbox 360 version) there are sixteen levels.

Some missions permit the player to use the dragon Saphira in combat. The gameplay mechanics within these levels are largely similar to those in ground-based levels, with the exception of some different attack moves (such as tail attacks). Protagonist Eragon sits on Saphira's back during these sections, and can be made to fire magic arrows. The player has no choice as to whether or not they use Saphira. Similarly, the player cannot use Saphira in ground-based levels: they can call for her and she will swoop past, but it is not possible to use this feature to ride Saphira. There is a multiplayer co-op mode which allows two people to play through the main storyline. It is possible to switch from playing a one-player game to a two-player game at any time. There are no Internet multiplayer options.

== Plot ==
While hunting in The Spine, 15-year-old Eragon finds a mysterious blue stone. He keeps it, thinking that it can be sold or bartered. However, the stone is actually a dragon egg. Eragon names the dragon Saphira from the list of dragon names he heard from the storyteller Brom. Saphira's hatching attracts the attention of the cruel king Galbatorix. The king dispatches servants to Eragon's village to find the dragon. They are unsuccessful and Eragon's uncle is killed and his home burned down. Brom, whom Eragon considers as nothing more than an old storyteller, helps him fight his way out of the village. He then gives Eragon an old sword, known as Zar'roc in the book series.

Eragon and Saphira make their way to Daret, where they are attacked in the docks. They find the rest of the town on fire and hold off a swarm of the king's servants as the villagers try to put out these fires. After leaving Daret the three are pursued by a group of Ra'zac. The group are caught in an ambush: Saphira becomes trapped under debris and Eragon must both try to free her and hold off the Ra'zac. After defeating the nearby enemies, the group make their way to Gil'ead, where Eragon and Brom sneak through the city and keep to try and free Arya. After a lengthy battle through Durza's fortress, Eragon meets Arya and Murtagh, who now join the group. This helps alleviate the mournful situation when Brom jumps in the way of a spear intended to kill Eragon and is fatally injured and dies.

The group escape from Gil'ead on Saphira's back, but face some Kull in the ruins of Orthiad. After defeating many Kull and Urgals they make their way to the Beor Mountains, where more Urgals lie in wait. They then sneak through an Urgal encampment, and make their way through a misty gorge. The group get to the Varden's hideout and defend it against hordes of Urgals. Eragon and Saphira then face Durza a second time, mounted on the back of a huge, batlike monster, eventually killing him.

== Development ==
On April 18, 2006, Vivendi Universal Games announced that they were to publish a video game adaptation of the Eragon film to be released in December of the same year, targeting personal computers and all major sixth- and seventh-generation platforms, except GameCube, Wii and PlayStation 3, and ultimately released just days before the launches of the latter two consoles. The console versions were set to be developed by Stormfront Studios, who had previously worked on the game adaptation of The Lord of the Rings: The Two Towers. Amaze Entertainment, who had previously worked on the game versions of Pirates of the Caribbean and Over the Hedge, were to develop the handheld versions. On the same day, Vivendi announced that the first possible chance to see the game would be at the Electronic Entertainment Expo in May 2006. On May 11, 2006, it was confirmed by Yahoo that the game had been in development since pre-production of the film.

The game was previewed at Comic-Con 2006, where the public was allowed to play only one level named the Daret Bridge. The enemies consisted entirely of Urgals, and the player had to overcome several obstacles using magic and Saphira. Christopher Paolini played other levels at Comic-Con, such as Spine Mountains. The game was also shown at the 2006 Games Convention in Germany. Actress Sienna Guillory, who plays the elf Arya in the film, made personal appearances at the Vivendi stand to promote the game. In October 2006, it was announced that the actors from the Eragon film would lend their voices to the game adaptation. Specifically, Edward Speleers (playing the title character), Sienna Guillory (Arya), Garrett Hedlund (Murtagh) and Robert Carlyle (Durza) were slated to lend their voices.

Animation supervisor Wes Takahashi served as an external art director for the game.

== Releases ==
An ingame screenshot from the PC version

The console and PC versions of the game are very similar, focusing on the same style of gameplay. However, the Xbox 360 edition features two exclusive levels. One is on foot as Eragon, and Saphira is controlled in the second mission. It also features the Kull, an enemy from the novels. However, there are differences between their description in the novels and their appearance in the games. In the books, they are eight feet tall and wield the same weapons as other Urgals, but the game depicts them as twelve-foot-tall brutes wielding flaming clubs.

The handheld games are significantly different from the PC and console versions. The Game Boy Advance game centers on role-playing rather than combat, whilst the PSP game focuses on multiplayer action and aerial dragon levels. The DS edition uses its touchscreen in the battle system.

Another version was released for mobile phones. It allows alternate control of Eragon and Saphira, but unlike the console versions it allows multiple paths to be taken whilst still following the main storyline and allows customization of the playable character (in terms of skills which can be selected). The mobile game also provides a cheat code which, when entered into the console versions, causes the "fury mode" to become available. The Official Strategy Guide was published by Primagames and authored by Eric Mylonas. On December 6, 2006, a preview of the guide was made available from the Sierra webpage.

== Reception ==
Reception

Aggregate score
Aggregator	Score
Metacritic	DS: 63/100; GBA: 70/100; PC: 51/100; PS2: 51/100; PSP: 59/100; XBOX: 49/100; X360: 48/100

Review scores
Publication	Score
GameSpot	4.2/10
GameSpy	2/5
IGN	DS: 7.5/10; X360: 4.7/10
Official Xbox Magazine (US)	4.0/10

Eragon received "mixed or average" reviews according to review aggregator sites Metacritic and GameRankings.

GameSpot rated the game 4.2 out of 10, and GameSpy gave it a similar score of 2 out of 5. PC Gamer UK slated the PC version of the game, describing the plot as "thinner than hospital undies", complaining about the tedious and repetitive side-scrolling action. They ended up summarising it as "a profoundly uninspiring tie-in" and gave it 53%. IGN came to a similar conclusion, primarily criticising the poor camera, unsophisticated combat and shortness. They rated the game 4.7 out of a possible 10.

However, the handheld versions of the game generally received more positive reviews. The Nintendo DS version received a positive review from IGN, who praised it for its "solid gameplay, enjoyable quests, being long for a movie license, and having thorough menu and tutorial system". It received 7.5 out of a possible 10. IGN said that it is surprisingly well developed for a Nintendo DS game.
