= African Revival =

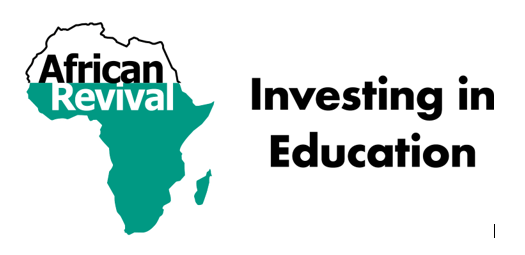
- Founded: 2005
- Purpose: International Development, Education, Sustainability, Livelihoods
- Location: Send, Surrey, UK
- Method: Education Assistance
- Board Chair: Carl Shuker
- Key people: David Lale (Executive Director)
- Website: http://www.africanrevival.org/

African Revival is a UK charity that focuses on providing access to quality education in sub-Saharan Africa, in particular northern Uganda.

== History ==
African Revival was founded in 2005 by the UK businessman Tony Allen.
