= Take a Girl Like You (film) =

1970 British film by Jonathan Miller

- Theatrical release poster
- Directed by: Jonathan Miller
- Screenplay by: George Melly
- Based on: Take a Girl Like You by Kingsley Amis
- Produced by: Hal E. Chester
- Starring: Hayley Mills; Oliver Reed; Noel Harrison
- Cinematography: Dick Bush
- Edited by: Jack Harris; Rex Pyke
- Music by: Stanley Myers
- Production company: Albion Film Distributors
- Distributed by: Columbia Pictures
- Release date: 16 December 1970; (US)
- Running time: 101 minutes
- Country: United Kingdom
- Language: English

Take a Girl Like You is a 1970 British romantic comedy drama film directed by Jonathan Miller and starring Hayley Mills, Oliver Reed and Noel Harrison. Based on the 1960 novel Take a Girl Like You by Kingsley Amis, it was adapted by George Melly.

== Synopsis ==
Northerner Jenny arrives in a town near London to take up a job as a teacher, and she has taken lodgings with a local political candidate. She quickly meets Patrick, who knows another girl at the lodging house but shares the goal, along with his friend Julian, of having sex with as many women as possible.

After a first date which ends at Patrick's flat for coffee, Patrick is shocked when Jenny tells him she is a virgin and intends to stay that way until she meets the right man. Jenny is attracted to Patrick, so they get into a volatile relationship as Patrick tries to change Jenny's mind, without giving up his bachelor status.

== Cast ==
- Hayley Mills as Jenny Bunn
- Oliver Reed as Patrick Standish
- Noel Harrison as Julian Ormerod
- John Bird as Dick Thompson
- Sheila Hancock as Martha Thompson
- Aimi MacDonald as Wendy
- Geraldine Sherman as Anna Le Page
- Ronald Lacey as Graham McClintoch
- John Fortune as Sir Gerald
- Imogen Hassall as Samantha
- Pippa Steel as Ted
- Penelope Keith as Tory lady
- Nicholas Courtney as panel chairman
- George Woodbridge as publican
- Jimmy Gardner as voter
- Nerys Hughes as teacher
- Jean Marlow as mother
- Howard Goorney as Labour agent

== Production ==
Amis' novel was published in 1960. In April 1961, Roy Ward Baker announced he would make a film of the novel after he finished Flame in the Streets (1961) but the project did not happen. Baker later said he could not get a script he was happy with.

In April 1968, it was announced that producer Hal Chester would make a version of the novel under his new contract with Columbia Pictures. George Melly was writing the script and the director would be Jonathan Miller. Miller had directed for TV before, notably Alice in Wonderland (1966) and Whistle and I'll Come to You (1968), but this was his first feature.

Miller admitted his "motives were slightly at fault in accepting the project to begin with. I was thinking that... well, Mike Nichols can make a lot of money, why shouldn't I? I accepted the project probably too eagerly. I think it was probably one of Amis' best novels but there were a lot of things to be said against filming it."

Miller says "the difficulties began to double" during scripting "because rather than let the script happen spontaneously, the producer sat in on its manufacture at almost every stage. I'm not saying he didn't work very hard and have the best intentions; it's just that his conception and our conception of the intentions were hopelessly at odds."

Miller says the story was "old fashioned" and that he and writer Melly "were forced into making" the story "even more old fashioned by making it more sentimental. Gradually I found myself boxed in to a very conventional, almost 1950s studio situation and the final cut was beyond my control."

Miller admitted "perhaps what we were doing was something quite dishonest in trying to steal in a realistic film inside the shell of a commercial enterprise. I don't think the two can be done."

In December 1968, Hayley Mills signed to star. Filming started March 1969 in London.

== Reception ==
The film was a commercial and critical flop. It was the last film produced by Hal Chester and the only feature directed by Miller.

The Monthly Film Bulletin wrote: "Neither Jonathan Miller's direction nor George Melly's script, both equally flaccid, suggest that Kingsley Amis' novel is now anything but a complete anachronism. Its cosy provincial setting, its simple division of the world into virgins and Lotharios, its belief in the irresistible humour of local politics combine to create a quaint insularity that one associates with the Ian Carmichael–Boulting Brothers films of the Fifties, when doubtless Peter Sellers would have played the randy and muddle-headed Labour councillor, here acted with frantic uncertainty by John Bird. In the hands of Jonathan Miller the film gradually falls apart: jokes are mistimed, performances allowed to run out of steam, dialogue hurriedly postsynchronised (and so muffled that the early scenes sound as if they were recorded in an aquarium). In the circumstances, Hayley Mills and Oliver Reed come through with some credit."

Filmink argued "For all its swinging trappings, at its heart this is a Rock Hudson-Doris Day-Tony Randall comedy with Oliver Reed as Rock, Hayley as Doris and Noel Harrison as Randall" adding "Mills claims the producer wanted a sexy comedy while Miller wanted a satire, which may explain why the end result was a mess."

The Radio Times Guide to Films gave the film 2/5 stars, writing: "Filmed at the tail end of 1960s, it seemed dated on release, with Hayley Mills valiantly trying to remain virginal despite the best efforts of Labour councillor and landlord John Bird and art teacher Oliver Reed, who of course is a bit of a bohemian. It's directed with an uncertain feeling by Jonathan Miller."

Leslie Halliwell said: "Old-fashioned novelette with sex trimmings and neither zest nor humour."
