= Take a Girl Like You =

1960 novel by Kingsley Amis

- First edition
- Author: Kingsley Amis
- Language: English
- Genre: Comic novel
- Publisher: Gollancz
- Publication date: 1960
- Publication place: United Kingdom
- Media type: Print (Paperback)
- Pages: 320 pp

Take a Girl Like You is a comic novel by Kingsley Amis. The narrative follows the progress of twenty-year-old Jenny Bunn, who has moved from her family home in the North of England to a small town not far from London to teach primary school children. Jenny is a 'traditional' Northern working-class girl whose dusky beauty strikes people as being at odds with the old-fashioned values she has gained from her upbringing, not least the conviction of 'no sex before marriage'. A thread of the novel concerns the frustrations of the morally dubious Patrick Standish, a 30-year-old teacher at a local private secondary school and his attempts to seduce Jenny; all this occurs against a backdrop of Jenny's new teaching job, Patrick's work and his leisure time with flatmate and colleague Graham and their new acquaintance, the well-off and somewhat older man-about-town, Julian Ormerod.

== Plot ==
The novel opens with Jenny Bunn's arrival at her lodging-house. She is a young, strikingly beautiful Northern girl who has moved to a small town outside London to take her first teaching job. Jenny has rented a room in the home of a middle-aged couple, Dick and Martha Thompson. Dick is an auctioneer and Martha is a housewife who is bored, cynical and at times openly hostile towards Jenny. Anna, the Thompsons' other lodger, is a changeable young woman who is apparently French.

Within half an hour of her arrival, Jenny meets Patrick Standish, an acquaintance of the Thompsons, who wastes no time in asking if he can ring her to arrange a date. Patrick takes Jenny to what she sees as a fashionable, upmarket restaurant (but which Amis describes as a classless provincial pseudo-Italianate place). Bowled over by Patrick's charm, Jenny accompanies him in his noisy sports car to the flat he shares with his teaching colleague, Graham, who is, by Patrick's arrangement, not at home. A cosy session of listening to gramophone records and kissing (enough for Jenny on a first date) develops at Patrick's behest into heavy petting, which Patrick takes for granted will lead to the bedroom. Jenny is resistant and pulls his hair to make him stop. She explains to Patrick's astonishment that she is and intends to remain a virgin until she is married.

The rest of the novel relates, from Jenny's point of view, the progress of her relationship with Patrick, her activities as a new teacher, getting to know the people around her, and a string of incidents such as a visit to Julian's house, a date with Graham and Dick making a clumsy pass at her in the kitchen.

From Patrick's point of view Amis describes his activities at school, his outlook on life and the escapades that follow his meeting the urbane Julian Ormerod, who has a big house in the countryside near the town. A lengthy section of the book is assigned to a trip with Julian to London, which includes a trawl around the strip clubs of Soho, a visit to the apartment of two of Julian's lady friends and a night on the town for the four of them, in which Patrick has too much to drink.

For a time, Jenny and Patrick enjoy a carefree period of 'going steady', but this is not enough for Patrick, who finds himself sexually frustrated. In the end, he gives Jenny an ultimatum: either she has sex with him or the relationship is over. Jenny says she will. Patrick, after ensuring the absence of Graham, waits for her to come to his flat but she doesn't arrive. So Patrick has sex with a teenage girl who happens to knock on his door, who turns out to be his headmaster's daughter.

Patrick and Jenny break up, but at a boozy and riotous party at Julian's house, Patrick rapes a tired and drunk Jenny in one of the guest bedrooms. Julian disapproves of Patrick's behaviour and is sympathetic to Jenny, who is at first very upset and says she never wants to see Patrick again. Later in the day, Jenny accepts what has happened as inevitable and takes Patrick back. There is no obvious happy ending.

Many years later, Amis published a sequel, Difficulties with Girls, in which Patrick and Jenny are married, still childlessly (to Jenny's disappointment), and Patrick has a roving eye.

== Style ==
Amis's style, in common with that of other mid-twentieth century writers but in contrast to that of writers like James, Woolf and Joyce, has been described as "neo-realist". Rabinovitz writes of these neo-realist writers that

Their styles are plain, their time-sequences are chronological, and they make no use of myth, symbol or stream-of-consciousness inner narratives.

— Rabinovitz

To bring the world of the novel as close as possible to the physical world of the reader, Amis takes great care to describe in great detail, in what appears to be a series of entirely incidental details; for example, the minutiae of the lodging house are meticulously (and humorously) described:

[The kitchen] door had another little brass knocker on it, this time representing a religious-looking person on a donkey. The room was a long narrow one that ended with a further door and a large, oblong, buff-coloured stove. A medium-sized woman with reddish hair and a purple dress was doing something to the stove but stopped when they came in.

— Rabinovitz

The plot of Take a Girl Like You follows traditional realistic conventions and has been compared to that of Clarissa (Samuel Richardson, 1748). Like Clarissa, Jenny Bunn is young, beautiful and virtuous and attempts to defend her virginity, whilst providing an opportunity for the next assault.

== Film ==
Take a Girl Like You was filmed in 1970, directed by Jonathan Miller from an adaptation by George Melly. It starred Hayley Mills, Oliver Reed, Sheila Hancock, Ronald Lacey, John Bird, Noel Harrison, Aimi MacDonald and Penelope Keith. A three part television series adapted by Andrew Davies was made in 2000.

== Sources ==
- Farce and Society: The Range of Kingsley Amis, R. B. Parker, Wisconsin Studies in Contemporary Literature, Vol. 2, No. 3 (Autumn, 1961), pp. 27–38
