= When You're Gone (Avril Lavigne song) =

2007 single by Avril Lavigne

Single by Avril Lavigne

from the album The Best Damn Thing
- B-side: "Girlfriend"
- Released: 19 June 2007
- Recorded: October 2006
- Studio: Pulse Recording (Los Angeles, California); Sunset Sound (Hollywood, California); Abbey Road (London, England)
- Genre: Soft rock; pop rock
- Length: 4:00
- Label: RCA
- Songwriters: Avril Lavigne; Butch Walker
- Producer: Butch Walker

Avril Lavigne singles chronology
| "Girlfriend" (2007) | "When You're Gone" (2007) | "Hot" (2007) |

Music video
- "When You're Gone" on YouTube

"When You're Gone" is a song by the Canadian singer-songwriter Avril Lavigne from her third album, The Best Damn Thing (2007). It was released as the second single from the album on 19 June 2007, by RCA Records. Lavigne co-wrote the song with Butch Walker, whilst production was solely helmed by Walker. According to Lavigne, the song is about saying goodbye to and missing a person that one cares about.

Commercially, "When You're Gone" reached the top 10 in Austria, Australia, Canada, Croatia, Ireland, Italy, the Netherlands, Sweden, and the United Kingdom. In the United States, it peaked at number 24 on the Billboard Hot 100. It earned Lavigne Favorite Artist at the 2008 MuchMusic Video Awards.

== Background ==
Avril Lavigne has said the song "is about being with someone you love, and you have to say goodbye, and all the little things you miss about them". The song may have been inspired by Lavigne's then-husband, Deryck Whibley, although in an interview in Northern Ireland with The Belfast Telegraph she did not confirm this. According to her, she did not intend the song to be a love song, but she was writing a slow song and the process brought out "all that emotional stuff" in her. "It's not cheesy, because I wrote it", she said. "If I was older, a professional writer coming up with all that, that would be lame."

Billboard magazine describes the song as "a power ballad with a piano and synth introduction". Composer Rob Mathes orchestrated the song with genuine string section, although the brief opening note, before the piano came in, was on a synthesizer.

== Critical reception ==
"When You're Gone" has received mixed reviews from music critics. Alex Nunn wrote that Avril hasn't lost her sense in ballads with this song. Stylus was mixed calling the song "turgid and humdrum," but "taken at times by an exhilarating slickness." Dave Donnely was mixed to positive: "Ballad and expected next single 'When You're Gone' may be the best of the bunch, though it's superficially like any number of pop-rock ballads, with contemplative lyrics lending the album a little bit of emotional depth. The theme, separation from a lover, is universal, and the lyrics simple: "I always needed time on my own/I never thought I'd need you there when I cried/And the days feel like years when I'm alone/And the bed where you lie is made up on your side." PopMatters stated that this song tries to match "I'm with You" but it fails. On a more negative note, Darryl Sterdan of JAM! described the song as "a standard piano-and-strings weeper" and went on to tell the reader to skip-it. In an AOL Radio listener's poll, "When You're Gone" was voted Lavigne's eighth best song.

=== Accolades ===
Key
| † | Indicates non-competitive categories |

| Award/Publisher | Year | Category | Result | Ref. |
|---|---|---|---|---|
| BMI Pop Music Awards | 2009 | Award-Winning Songs † | Won | |
| MuchMusic Video Awards | 2008 | UR Fave: Artist | Won | |
| Planeta Awards | 2007 | Ballad of the Year | Won | |
| Planeta Awards | 2007 | Best Female Vocal Performance | Nominated | |
| SOCAN Awards | 2008 | Pop/Rock Music Award † | Won | |

== Chart performance ==
Before its release as a single in the United States, "When You're Gone" reached number ninety on the US Billboard Hot 100 and number 77 on the Billboard Pop 100, in the Billboard issue dated 5 May 2007. The song later re-entered the charts and peaked at numbers 24 and 16, respectively. It did well on the charts in Canada, where it reached number eight. As of September 2015, "When You're Gone" has sold 1,290,000 digital copies in the United States.

The single did well in European charts ending at number four of the European Hot 100. "When You're Gone" debuted at number thirty-two on UK Singles Chart, and peaked at number three. It ended the year as the 54th most purchased song in the UK. In Ireland, it reached number four. In the Continental Europe, "When You're Gone" peaked inside top twenty in countries such as Austria, Denmark, France, Germany, Italy, Spain and Sweden. However, the song was a minor hit in Belgium (Flanders and Wallonia), where it failed to reach top twenty.

== Music video ==
=== Background ===
The video was directed by Marc Klasfeld, who also directed Sum 41's music videos. Lavigne came up with the concept for the video, which she said is very personal. Portions of the video were filmed at California State University, Northridge's Botanic Garden. The video was premiered on MuchMusic in Canada on 6 June 2007 during the 5 pm broadcast of MuchOnDemand. While in the United States it was premiered on MTV's TRL on 21 June. It reached the No. 1 spot on both TV music channel countdowns on August.

One year later the video won the People's Choice: Favourite Canadian Artist award during the 2008 MuchMusic Video Awards. As of January 2024, the music video for "When You're Gone" has reached 525 million views on YouTube.

=== Synopsis ===
A still from the music video showing Lavigne playing a piano in an abandoned house.

The video portrays three relationships in different age groups, but in the same situation involving these relationships on the verge of being destroyed. The first vignette involves a pregnant woman whose husband is fighting in the war. After his departure, she watches news of war casualties on the television and is distraught when she is not receive any texts from her husband telling her how he is doing. The second involves an elderly man whose wife has recently died. He becomes emotional when he looks over her clothes and mementos from their time together. The third involves a teenage couple relaxing in the park together only to be caught by the girl's controlling mother who forbids them from seeing each other ever again. The mother locks her daughter in her bedroom, where the girl helplessly cries over the photos of her and her boyfriend on her camera. Interspersed are scenes of Lavigne wandering in a field and playing a piano in an abandoned house. In the end, the walls of all the respective houses collapse, and all three vignettes break out into daylight with the teenage girl returning to the place where the duo were caught despite his absence, the elderly man raising a toast to his wife in a graveyard, and the pregnant woman attending a military memorial service with other military wives, where she finally receives a text from her husband saying: "I'm okay. I miss U."

== Live performances ==
Lavigne performed the song during European and Asian festivals that took part of her 2007 Promotional Tour as well as TV shows and award shows worldwide.

== Usage in other media ==
The song was used in the second-season finale of the MTV show The Hills, playing during the climatic "moving out" scene between former best friends Lauren Conrad and Heidi Montag. It was also used in the series 7 finale of Two Pints of Lager and a Packet of Crisps. The song is used as the background music for the third generation Toyota Alphard commercial for the Japanese market, with Kate Winslet and Selena Gomez.

== Track listings and formats ==
- European CD single
1. "When You're Gone" – 4:01
2. "Girlfriend" (Dr. Luke Remix feat. Lil Mama) – 3:26
- Japanese CD single
1. "When You're Gone" (Album Version) – 4:00
2. "When You're Gone" (Instrumental) – 4:01
3. "Girlfriend" (Japanese Version) – 3:37
- Australian, German, and Taiwanese CD single
1. "When You're Gone" – 4:01
2. "Girlfriend" (Dr. Luke Remix feat. Lil Mama) – 3:25
3. "Girlfriend" (The Submarines' Time Warp '66 Mix) – 3:12
4. "When You're Gone" (video)

== Credits and personnel ==
Credits and personnel are adapted from the "When You're Gone" CD single liner notes.

- Avril Lavigne – vocals, writer, background vocals
- Butch Walker – writer, producer, bass, guitars, keyboards, programming, percussion, background vocals
- Tom Lord-Alge – mixing
- Stephen Marcussen – mastering at Marcussen Mastering (Hollywood)
- Karl Egsieker – engineering at Pulse Recordings and Sunset Sounds
- Rob Mathes – string arrangement and conduction
- Josh Freese – drums

== Charts ==
=== Weekly charts ===
| Chart (2007) | Peak position |
|---|---|
| Australia (ARIA) | 4 |
| Austria (Ö3 Austria Top 40) | 10 |
| Belgium (Ultratop 50 Flanders) | 31 |
| Belgium (Ultratip Bubbling Under Wallonia) | 2 |
| Canada Hot 100 (Billboard) | 8 |
| Canada AC (Billboard) | 8 |
| Canada CHR/Top 40 (Billboard) | 5 |
| Canada Hot AC (Billboard) | 3 |
| CIS Airplay (TopHit) | 62 |
| Costa Rica (EFE) | 4 |
| Croatia International Airplay (HRT) | 7 |
| Czech Republic Airplay (ČNS IFPI) | 3 |
| Denmark (Tracklisten) | 31 |
| Europe (Eurochart Hot 100) | 4 |
| France (SNEP) | 17 |
| Germany (GfK) | 17 |
| Germany Airplay (BVMI) | 2 |
| Hungary (Editors' Choice Top 40) | 37 |
| Ireland (IRMA) | 4 |
| Italy (FIMI) | 4 |
| Japan (Oricon) | 83 |
| Lithuania (EHR) | 1 |
| Netherlands (Dutch Top 40 Tipparade) | 2 |
| Netherlands (Single Top 100) | 57 |
| New Zealand (Recorded Music NZ) | 26 |
| Romania (Romanian Top 100) | 69 |
| Scotland Singles (OCC) | 2 |
| Slovakia Airplay (ČNS IFPI) | 11 |
| Sweden (Sverigetopplistan) | 8 |
| Switzerland (Schweizer Hitparade) | 14 |
| UK Singles (OCC) | 3 |
| US Billboard Hot 100 | 24 |
| US Adult Contemporary (Billboard) | 30 |
| US Adult Pop Airplay (Billboard) | 10 |
| US Pop Airplay (Billboard) | 9 |
| Venezuela Pop Rock (Record Report) | 2 |

=== Year-end charts ===
| Chart (2007) | Rank |
|---|---|
| Australia (ARIA) | 33 |
| Austria (Ö3 Austria Top 40) | 41 |
| Brazil (Crowley) | 78 |
| Canada (Canadian Hot 100) | 25 |
| Europe (Eurochart Hot 100) | 56 |
| Germany (Media Control GfK) | 84 |
| Italy (FIMI) | 21 |
| Lebanon (The Official Lebanese Top 20) | 87 |
| Switzerland (Schweizer Hitparade) | 49 |
| UK Singles (OCC) | 54 |
| US Adult Top 40 (Billboard) | 34 |

== Certifications ==
| Region | Certification | Certified units/sales |
|---|---|---|
| Australia (ARIA) | Platinum | 70,000^{^} |
| Brazil (Pro-Música Brasil) | Platinum | 60,000^{*} |
| Canada (Music Canada) | 2× Platinum | 160,000^{‡} |
| Japan (RIAJ) Digital single | Gold | 100,000^{*} |
| New Zealand (RMNZ) | Gold | 15,000^{‡} |
| United Kingdom (BPI) | Gold | 400,000^{‡} |
| United States (RIAA) | 2× Platinum | 2,000,000^{‡} |
^{*} Sales figures based on certification alone.^{^} Shipments figures based on certification alone.^{‡} Sales+streaming figures based on certification alone.

== Release history ==
Release dates and formats for "When You're Gone"
| Region | Date | Format | Label | Ref. |
|---|---|---|---|---|
| United States | June 19, 2007 | Contemporary hit radio | RCA | |
| Japan | June 20, 2007 | CD | Sony | |
| Germany | June 29, 2007 | CD | Sony | |
| United Kingdom | July 2, 2007 | CD | Sony | |
