= Eragon (film) =

2006 fantasy adventure film directed by Stefen Fangmeier

- Theatrical release poster
- Directed by: Stefen Fangmeier
- Screenplay by: Peter Buchman
- Based on: Eragon by Christopher Paolini
- Produced by: John Davis; Wyck Godfrey
- Starring: Ed Speleers; Jeremy Irons; Sienna Guillory; Robert Carlyle; Djimon Hounsou; Garrett Hedlund; Joss Stone; Rachel Weisz; John Malkovich
- Cinematography: Hugh Johnson
- Edited by: Roger Barton; Masahiro Hirakubo; Chris Lebenzon
- Music by: Patrick Doyle
- Production companies: Fox 2000 Pictures; Davis Entertainment; Dune Entertainment; Major Studio Partners; Ingenious Film Partners
- Distributed by: 20th Century Fox
- Release date: December 15, 2006
- Running time: 103 minutes
- Countries: United States; United Kingdom
- Language: English
- Budget: $100 million
- Box office: $250.4 million

Eragon (stylized in all lowercase) is a 2006 fantasy adventure film directed by Stefen Fangmeier (in his directorial debut) and written by Peter Buchman, loosely based on Christopher Paolini's 2002 novel of the same name. It stars Ed Speleers in the title role as well as Jeremy Irons, Sienna Guillory, Robert Carlyle, Djimon Hounsou, Garrett Hedlund, Joss Stone, and John Malkovich, with Rachel Weisz as Saphira the dragon. The film also marked the film debuts for Speleers and Stone.

Principal photography took place at the Mafilm Fót Studios in Hungary, starting on August 1, 2005. Visual effects and animation were provided by Industrial Light & Magic, Weta Digital and Cinesite. Eragon was released worldwide on December 15, 2006, by 20th Century Fox. It received widespread negative reviews from critics and book fans, who criticized its acting, screenplay, visuals and unfaithfulness to the source material, though its CGI and the performances of Speleers and Irons were praised by a few critics. It was the 10th worst reviewed film of 2006 on Rotten Tomatoes, but the 31st highest-grossing film of 2006 in the US. The film was released for home entertainment on March 20, 2007. Originally, Eragon was supposed to be the first in a franchise based on Paolini's Inheritance Cycle book series, with Fangmeier shooting both Eldest and Brisingr back-to-back. However, following the poor critical reception of Eragon on its release, and its box-office performance, the planned sequels were not produced.

== Plot ==
Eons ago, in the land of Alagaësia, an order called the Dragon Riders was created to oversee the countries and bring peace to the world. However, a former Dragon Rider, Galbatorix, betrayed and destroyed the Dragon Riders, killing them all and the dragons alike. Galbatorix now rules over Alagaësia with an iron fist while rebels called the Varden oppose him.

Arya, princess of the elf kingdom, Ellesméra, flees with a strange stone while being pursued by a dark sorcerer, Durza, working for Galbatorix. Durza corners Arya, but she uses her magic to teleport the stone away moments before she is captured.

Eragon, a poor farm boy living in the country with his uncle, Garrow, and cousin, Roran, is hunting when he witnesses the stone appearing. Hoping to trade it for food, Eragon brings the stone home but realizes it is actually an egg when a blue dragon hatches from it. As he touches the dragon, a magical mark appears on his palm. Several individuals sense the egg hatching, including Arya, an old storyteller, Brom, and Galbatorix himself.

Eragon shelters and feeds the dragon, and he teaches her to fly as she grows to full size. She telepathically speaks to him and calls herself Saphira. When they are out, Durza's monstrous minions, the Ra'zac, arrive at the village to look for the dragon and the rider, killing Garrow. Blaming Saphira for his uncle's death, Eragon sends her away. Brom shows up, takes Eragon away from the village, warns him of Saphira's importance, and urges him to call her back. Eragon calls Saphira, and she comes back, forgiving him for what he previously said.

Brom leads the group to the Varden. On the way, Brom tells Eragon about dragon riders, Galbatorix, Durza, and the Ra'zac. He also trains Eragon in sword-fighting. In a small village, Eragon meets a fortune-telling witch named Angela, who tells him of Arya and a dangerous path toward future battles ahead. When Galbatorix's servants, the Urgals, attack the duo, Eragon attempts to mimic Brom after earlier witnessing him create fire with an incantation and inadvertently wipes out the whole group with a blast of blue fire before falling unconscious from the strain. Brom teaches Eragon to control his magic and bond his powers with Saphira. After flying for the first time, Eragon and Saphira help Brom kill the Ra'zac, and Brom reveals he was once a rider, his dragon killed by Morzan, a rogue rider who allied with Galbatorix.

Durza sets a trap for Eragon, using Arya as bait. Hearing her calls, Eragon sets out to rescue her but is ambushed by Durza. Eragon is outmatched, and Brom arrives to help but is mortally wounded. The trio escapes, and Brom dies while flying on Saphira. Eragon takes possession of Brom's sword, Zar'roc, which previously belonged to Morzan.

Eragon confronts a hooded figure tailing the group. The figure, a man named Murtagh, proceeds to guide them to the Varden. Once there, Murtagh is imprisoned by the Varden after it is revealed he is Morzan's son. Durza leads Galbatorix's forces and attacks the rebels' base, and Eragon, Saphira, and Arya join the battle. Murtagh frees himself during the battle and assists the Varden, saving the Dwarf King Hrothgar. Eragon and Saphira duel in the skies with Durza. They eventually kill him, but Saphira is heavily injured. Eragon uses magic to heal her before passing out.

The following morning, Eragon awakes with Murtagh and a fully healed Saphira. They catch up with Arya, who is on her way to Ellesméra to lead the elves in the coming war against Galbatorix. They part ways, promising to meet again. Meanwhile, Galbatorix slashes at his hanging map of Alagaësia, revealing his pitch-black dragon, Shruikan.

== Cast ==
- Ed Speleers as Eragon, a farmboy who found a mysterious stone and became a dragon rider
- Jeremy Irons as Brom, an elderly vagrant who was once a dragon rider
- Sienna Guillory as Arya, the elven princess of Ellesméra who stole the dragon stone from Galbatorix
- Robert Carlyle as Durza, a powerful shade leading Galbatorix's army
- Djimon Hounsou as Ajihad, resistance leader of the Varden
- Garrett Hedlund as Murtagh, a roguish archer who was the son of the traitor, Morzan
- Joss Stone as Angela, a witch who reads Eragon's fortune
- John Malkovich as Galbatorix, the tyrannical king of Alagaësia and the traitor to the dragon riders
- Rachel Weisz as Saphira, Eragon's best friend and dragon
- Alun Armstrong as Garrow, Eragon's uncle
- Christopher Egan as Roran, Eragon's cousin
- Gary Lewis as Hrothgar
- Steve Speirs as Sloan
- Caroline Chikezie as Nasuada

== Production ==
=== Development ===
Plans to create a film based on Christopher Paolini's best-selling novel were first announced in February 2004. 20th Century Fox purchased the rights to Eragon. Screenwriter Peter Buchman, whose credits included Jurassic Park III, wrote the screenplay. Buchman, a fan of fantasy and science fiction literature and films, says he was "blown away" by the author's precociousness, his mastery of plot lines and characters, and his ability to create several completely imaginary worlds.

=== Casting ===
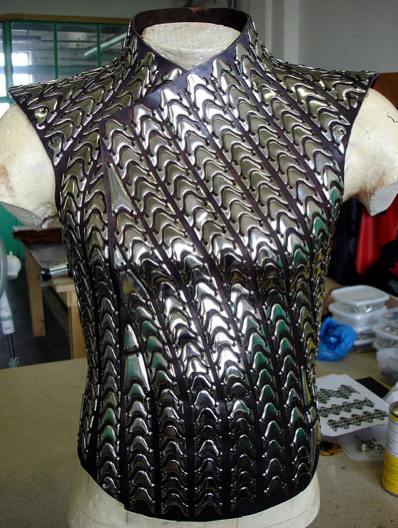
Leather and metal battle armor crafted by Whitaker Malem for Ed Speleers, who was cast in the lead role as Eragon.

Speleers was selected for the title role after a worldwide casting search. "Ed came in [to the casting session], and we just looked at each other and said, "That's Eragon, that's the guy from the book," said director Stefen Fangmeier: "I got a strong sense of Ed's sparkle, of his life. It's the kind of thing where you just know he's destined to become a movie star. Speleers won the role as he was trying to learn his lines for a school production of Hamlet. Others considered for the role included Alex Pettyfer but since production took place in central Europe and Pettyfer is afraid of flying, he declined the role.

On July 15, 2005, in an official press release from 20th Century Fox, it was confirmed that Speleers had signed on to the project. Over the following months, Jeremy Irons, John Malkovich, Chris Egan, and Djimon Hounsou were all confirmed as joining the Eragon cast. Paolini, author of the original novel, had expressed his wishes to be featured in a cameo role in the film — specifically, as a warrior who is beheaded in the battle of Farthen Dûr. However, he was unable because of his European book tour.

Jeremy Irons, who welcomed the opportunity to reintroduce himself to younger audiences, took on the role although Dungeons & Dragons (a previous fantasy film he had acted in) had flopped, and he said that he thought that Eragon "had been better managed" than that film. Emily Blunt was a finalist for the role of Arya.

=== Filming and visual effects ===
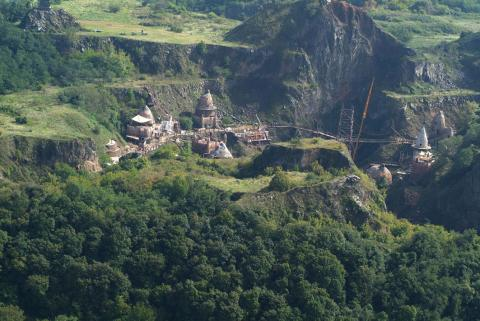
Aerial photograph of the Ság Mountain, which served as the backdrop for Farthen Dûr

In August 2005, Fox began filming Eragon at various locations throughout Hungary and Slovakia, including:

- Mafilm Studios, Fót, Hungary
- Pilisborosjenő, Budapest Metropolitan Area, Hungary
- Budapest, Hungary
- Ság-hegy, Hungary
- Celldömölk, Hungary
- High Tatras, Slovakia

Filming ended a month later in September, beginning the film's visual effects and animation stage, provided by Industrial Light & Magic (ILM), Weta Digital and Cinesite to create the film's CGI.

The decision was made later on in production to add feathers to the standard bat-like wings of the CGI dragon Saphira. The studio had been inspired by the Angel's wings in X-Men: The Last Stand. Jean Bolte, lead viewpaint artist for ILM on the film, calls them "skethers" (half-feathers, half-scales) and was inspired by the scales of the pangolin. It was eventually decided that Saphira's colors scheme should be subdued rather than vibrant to be more realistic.

=== Music ===
Eragon: Music from the Motion Picture

Soundtrack album by Patrick Doyle
- Released: December 12, 2006
- Recorded: 2005–2006
- Length: 55:24
- Label: RCA
- Producers: Patrick Doyle, Maggie Rodford

Patrick Doyle chronology
Wah-Wah (2006)	Eragon: Music from the Motion Picture (2006)	The Last Legion (2007)

Singles from Eragon soundtrack
- 1. "Keep Holding On" Released: November 17, 2006

The score for the film was composed and produced by Patrick Doyle. Avril Lavigne recorded the film's theme song, "Keep Holding On", which was featured in the credits and on the soundtrack. The track was released as a single in 2006 and peaked at number 17 on the US Billboard Hot 100 singles chart. It was later included on her 2007 album The Best Damn Thing.

Track listing

1. "Eragon"
2. "Roran Leaves"
3. "Saphira's First Flight"
4. "Ra'zac"
5. "Burning Farm"
6. "Fortune Teller"
7. "If You Were Flying"
8. "Brom's Story"
9. "Durza"
10. "Passing the Flame"
11. "Battle for Varden"
12. "Together"
13. "Saphira Returns"
14. "Legend of Eragon"
15. "Keep Holding On" – Avril Lavigne
16. "Once in Every Lifetime" – Jem

== Distribution ==
=== Video game ===
The video game based on the motion picture was developed by Stormfront Studios and Amaze Entertainment and was released in November 2006.

=== Home media ===
Eragon was released DVD and Blu-ray in the US on March 20, 2007. It debuted at number 1 on the national DVD sales charts and at number 3 on the DVD rental charts. It grossed more than US$35.2 million in rentals. It was released on DVD in Europe on April 16, 2007, and in Australia on April 18, 2007.

== Reception ==
=== Box office ===
Eragon grossed approximately $75 million in the US and $173.9 million elsewhere, grossing $249 million worldwide. Director Stefen Fangmeier believes that Fox was "modestly happy with the worldwide box office."

Eragon was in release for 17 weeks in the US, opening on December 15, 2006, and closing on April 8, 2007. It opened in 3,020 theaters, earning $8.7 million on opening day and $23.2 million across opening weekend, ranked 2nd behind The Pursuit of Happyness. Eragon's second weekend US box office dropped by almost 70%, possibly due to the opening of Night at the Museum, another family film from 20th Century Fox, the 41st biggest second weekend drop since this statistic was kept. Eragon's $75 million total US gross was the 31st highest for 2006.

The film earned $30.3 million in its opening weekend across 76 overseas markets, making it the number one film worldwide. This was attributed to the sheer scope of Eragon's global launch as the film ranked number 1 in fewer than half of the overseas territories it was released in. The foreign box office competition for the film's opening week was "soft;" had Eragon been released one year earlier, it would have been placed fourth. Eragon's UK opening was "a disappointment," in Australia it was "solid if unimpressive," but its most impressive market was France, where the film earned more than $21 million. The film's $249 million total worldwide gross was the 16th highest for 2006. Eragon grossed $86,995,160 on DVD from March 20, 2007 – May 13, 2007.

=== Critical response ===
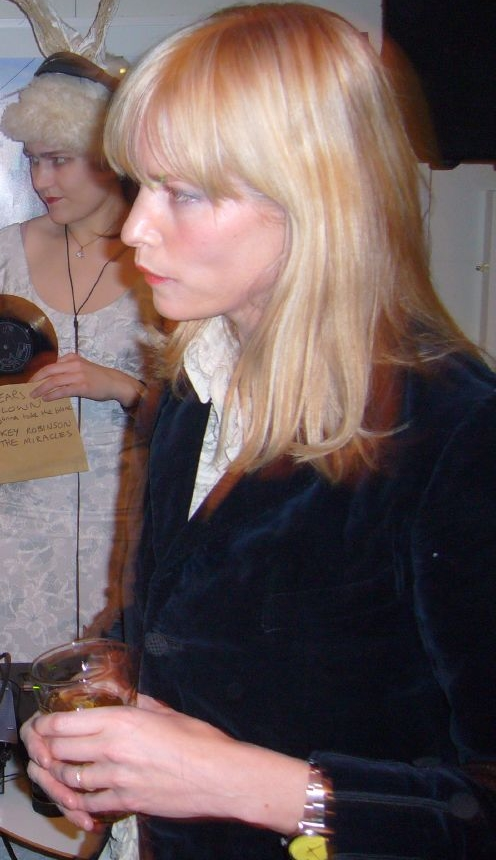
Sienna Guillory, who played Arya

On the review aggregator website Rotten Tomatoes, 15% of 124 critics' reviews are positive, with an average rating of 4.1/10. The website's consensus reads: "Eragon is a fantasy epic that lacks any magic, brought down to earth by unconvincing world-building and a litany of stars who seem bemused by the material." Metacritic, which uses a weighted average, assigned the film a score of 38 out of 100, based on 29 critics, indicating "generally unfavorable" reviews. Audiences surveyed by CinemaScore gave the film a grade "B" on scale of A+ to F.

The Seattle Times described the film as "technically accomplished, but fairly lifeless and at times a bit silly". The Hollywood Reporter said the world of Eragon was "without much texture or depth." The story was labeled "derivative" by The Washington Post, and "generic" by the Las Vegas Weekly. Newsday stressed this point further, asserting that only "nine-year-olds with no knowledge whatsoever of any of the six Star Wars movies would find the film original."

The acting was called "lame" by the Washington Post, plus "stilted" and "lifeless" by the Orlando Weekly. The dialogue was also criticized, with MSNBC labelling it "silly"; the Las Vegas Weekly called it "wooden". Positive reviews described the film as "fun" and "the stuff boys' fantasies are made of." The CGI work was called "imaginative" and Saphira was called a "magnificent creation." Christopher Paolini stated he enjoyed the film, particularly praising the performances of Jeremy Irons and Ed Speleers. Although he later stated in 2023 that "the original film is not really a bad film. But where it fails is it's not a great adaptation."

=== Accolades ===
- Saturn Awards (33rd)
  - Nominated: Best Fantasy Film
  - Nominated: Best Performance by a Younger Actor - Edward Speleers
- Costume Designers Guild (2006)
  - Nominated: Excellence in Costume Design for Film (Fantasy) - Kym Barrett

== Reboot ==
Around 2021, 15 years after the film's premiere, fans of the book series tweeted #EragonRemake in an effort to get Disney, the intellectual rights holders following their acquisition of 21st Century Fox, to revamp the book series into a possible television show for Disney+. Within hours, the hashtag began to trend with fans pushing for a proper adaptation. When Paolini found out about this movement, he encouraged the fans to keep at it and even joined it himself.

On July 25, 2022, Variety reported that a live action television series adaptation of Eragon was in early development for Disney+, with Paolini serving as a co-writer on the series, and with Bert Salke executive producing.
