= The Fork, the Witch, and the Worm =

2018 book by Christopher Paolini

- First edition
- Author: Christopher Paolini; one small part by Angela Paolini
- Language: English
- Genre: Fantasy
- Publisher: Alfred A. Knopf
- Publication date: December 31, 2018
- Publication place: United States
- Pages: 288
- ISBN: 9781984894861

The Fork, the Witch, and the Worm is the first book in the Tales from Alagaësia series by Christopher Paolini. It was published on December 31, 2018. Set in the world of The Inheritance Cycle a year after the events of Inheritance, it consists of three short stories, the second of which was penned by Paolini's sister, Angela.

The Fork, the Witch, and the Worm includes new characters and some already encountered in the original series, and tells of the many challenges Eragon and Saphira face as they establish the Dragon Riders in their new home far to the east of Alagaësia, integrating stories about Murtagh, Angela, and a village of Urgals.

== Plot ==
=== The Fork ===
Eragon struggles to keep up with the mundane administrative work required by his new role as leader of the Dragon Riders. Saphira convinces him to take a break and visit the Eldunarí, who show him a vision of Murtagh in Ceunon. In it, a disguised Murtagh meets in a tavern with a group of mercenaries, whom he had hired to search for a legendary dragon-scorched battlefield. The mercenaries show evidence of having found it, but refuse to tell him the location, attempting to extort him for more money. A fight ensues, and Murtagh is unable to directly subdue them with magic, even using the name of the ancient language, due to amulets given to them by a witch called Bachel. Nonetheless, Murtagh evades their wards by enchanting a fork as a weapon. Victorious, Murtagh leaves to join Thorn and continue his search.

=== The Witch ===
The witch Angela, traveling with Elva, unexpectedly arrives at the Riders’ mountain. She has Eragon read a number of out-of-order chapters of a memoir she is writing, whose strange contents hint that she has the ability to travel to worlds beyond Alagaësia. When Eragon asks if the memoir is true, she answers ambiguously.

=== The Worm ===
Eragon is disheartened when he fails to save two dwarves from a tunnel cave-in. An Urgal bard tells him the ancient tale of Vêrmund, the Worm of Kulkaras, a wild dragon who feasts on an Urgal clan and its livestock and then settles in a nearby mountain. When its best warriors fail to kill Vêrmund, the clan learns to adapt, hiding in tunnels and leaving livestock for the slumbering dragon when he wakes. Ilgra, a girl whose father was killed by Vêrmund, is filled with the desire for revenge and studies magic as a shaman's apprentice. She plans a trap to kill the dragon with a flood of water, believing that the water could extinguish his flame.

When a pair of Lethrblaka attack the clan, threatening to devour it completely, Ilgra wakes Vêrmund to fight them. The Lethrblaka evade his fire and pierce his scales with their beaks, gaining the advantage. Ilgra lures the three combatants into her trap and releases the flood, but it merely results in victory for Vêrmund, who returns to his mountain to heal. Ilgra then accepts her inability to kill the dragon and plans to live a more ordinary life among her clan.

When the story is completed, Eragon learns that a dragon egg has hatched.

== Reception ==
A review in The Oberlin Review encourages fans of The Inheritance Cycle to read The Fork, the Witch, and the Worm but cautions "if that’s not you, I would definitely advise that you pass".

A Kirkus Reviews review of The Fork, the Witch, and the Worm concludes that while the book is "not likely to lure in any new fans, Paolini’s readers will likely enjoy revisiting the characters and world".
