= Christopher Paolini =

American writer (born 1983)

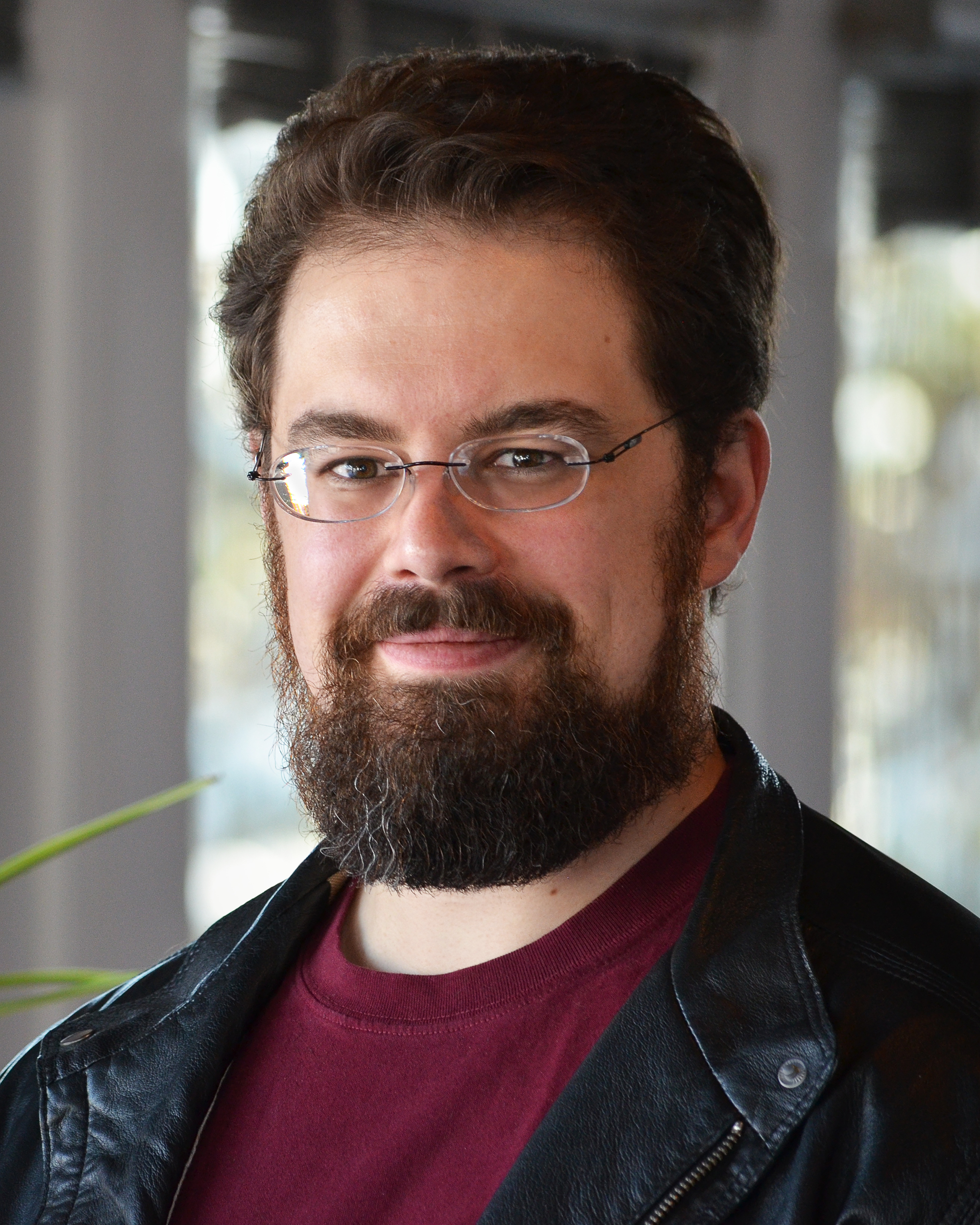
- Paolini in 2019
- Born: Christopher James Paolini; November 17, 1983 (age 42); Los Angeles, California, U.S.
- Citizenship: United States; Italy
- Occupation: Author
- Writing career
- Genres: Fantasy, science fiction
- Notable works: The Inheritance Cycle; To Sleep in a Sea of Stars
- Website: paolini.net

Signature
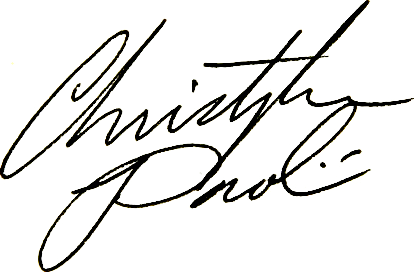

Christopher James Paolini (born November 17, 1983) is an American and Italian author. He is best known for The Inheritance Cycle, which consists of the books Eragon (2002), Eldest (2005), Brisingr (2008), Inheritance (2011), the follow-up short story collection The Fork, the Witch, and the Worm (2018), and Murtagh (2023), the first in a follow-up duology. His first science fiction novel, To Sleep in a Sea of Stars, was published on September 15, 2020. He lives in Paradise Valley, Montana, where he wrote his first book.

== Early life ==
Paolini was born in Los Angeles, California, and raised in the area of Paradise Valley, Montana. His family members include his parents, Kenneth Paolini and Talita Hodgkinson, and his younger sister, Angela Paolini. He is of Italian descent; his paternal grandfather was born in Rome and Paolini still has relatives there. Home schooled for the duration of his education, Paolini graduated from high school at the age of 15 through a set of accredited correspondence courses from the American School of Correspondence in Lansing, Illinois.

He has Italian citizenship.

== Career ==
He started his work on his first novel, Eragon, at the age of 15. This novel became the first of The Inheritance Cycle tetralogy, which is set in the mythical land of Alagaësia.

In 2002, Eragon was published for the first time by Paolini International LLC, his parents' publishing company. To promote the book, Paolini toured over 135 schools and libraries, discussing reading and writing, all the while dressed in "a medieval costume of red shirt, billowy black pants, lace-up boots, and a jaunty black cap." He drew the cover art for the first edition of Eragon, which featured Saphira's eye, along with the maps on the inside covers of his books.

In mid-2002, the stepson of author Carl Hiaasen found Eragon in a bookstore and loved it; this led to Hiaasen bringing it to the attention of his publisher, Alfred A. Knopf. Knopf subsequently made an offer to publish Eragon and the rest of The Inheritance Cycle. The second edition of Eragon was published by Knopf in August 2003. At the age of 19, Paolini became a New York Times–bestselling author.

In December 2006, Fox 2000 released the film adaptation of Eragon in theaters around the world. It received mostly negative reviews from critics, and made a combined domestic and international gross of $249,488,115 USD against a production budget of $100,000,000.

Eldest, the sequel to Eragon, was released August 23, 2005. The third book in the cycle, Brisingr, was released on September 20, 2008. Although The Inheritance Cycle was originally planned as a trilogy, a fourth book, Inheritance, was released on November 8, 2011, in the US, Australia, New Zealand, the EU, and India, and was subsequently translated and published in 53 countries. The Inheritance Cycle has sold more than 41 million copies.

On December 31, 2018, The Fork, the Witch, and the Worm, the first book in a series called Tales of Alagaësia, was published and released to the public.

Paolini's first science fiction novel, To Sleep in a Sea of Stars, was released on September 15, 2020, by Tor Books.

In October 2021, Christopher released Unity, an interactive Fractalverse story on his science fiction website Fractalverse.net.

On July 25, 2022, Variety reported that Paolini was co-writing a live action television series adaptation of Eragon for Disney+, with Bert Salke executive producing.

On October 3, 2022, Paolini announced Fractal Noise, the second installment in the Fractalverse and a prequel to To Sleep in a Sea of Stars. It was published on May 16, 2023.

On October 8, 2022, it was announced that To Sleep in a Sea of Stars has been optioned by Made Up Stories and Snoot Entertainment.

On November 7, 2023, Murtagh was released as the latest installment in Paolini's world of Alagaësia.

== Influences ==
Paolini's literary inspirations include the works of J. R. R. Tolkien and E. R. Eddison, as well as the epic poem Beowulf. Paolini has said that Eragon was "specifically inspired" by Jeremy Thatcher, Dragon Hatcher, by Bruce Coville. Other literary influences include David Eddings, Andre Norton, Brian Jacques, Anne McCaffrey, Raymond E. Feist, Mervyn Peake, Ursula K. Le Guin and Frank Herbert. Other favorite books include works by C. S. Lewis, George MacDonald, Neil Gaiman, Jane Yolen, Philip Pullman, and Garth Nix.

Nature influences much of Paolini's writing. In an interview with Sir Philip Pullman and Tamora Pierce, Paolini said that Paradise Valley, Montana, is "one of the main sources" of his inspiration.

In the acknowledgments of Brisingr, Paolini acknowledged the influence of Leon and Hiroko Kapp's The Craft of the Japanese Sword for his description of the forging of Eragon's sword. Additionally, Paolini has admitted that he is a Doctor Who fan, which inspired his reference to the "lonely god" (the epithet given to the Doctor by the Face of Boe in the episode "New Earth"), to "rooms that are bigger on the inside than the outside" (from "Questions Unanswered" in Inheritance), as well as to Raxacoricofallapatorius, the home of the Slitheen ("Blood Price" in Inheritance).

== Reception ==
Paolini's books have topped the charts of The New York Times, USA Today, and Publishers Weekly bestsellers lists.

The Guinness World Records recognized Christopher Paolini as the "youngest author of a bestselling book series" on January 5, 2011.

In 2024, the American Library Association chose Fractal Noise for the Listen List (2024).

== Bibliography ==
=== The Inheritance Cycle ===
==== Main series ====
1. Eragon (2002)
2. Eldest (2005)
3. Brisingr (2008)
4. Inheritance (2011)

==== Companion books/Side novels ====
- Eragon's Guide to Alagaësia (2009)
- The Official Eragon Coloring Book - with Ciruelo Cabral (2017)
- Tales from Alagaësia: The Fork, the Witch, and the Worm (2018)
- Murtagh (2023)

=== Fractalverse ===
- To Sleep in a Sea of Stars (2020)
- Allies (2020) - short story
- Unity (2021) - short story
- Fractal Noise (2023) - prequel
