= Murtagh (novel) =

2023 novel by Christopher Paolini

- Author: Christopher Paolini
- Cover artist: John Jude Palencar
- Publisher: Alfred A. Knopf
- Publication date: November 7, 2023
- ISBN: 978-0-5936-5086-8

Murtagh is a 2023 fantasy novel by American writer Christopher Paolini. Set in the land of Alagaësia, it tells the story of Eragon's half-brother, Murtagh, as he investigates a new threat to Alagaësia's people.

== Summary ==
Set a year after the events of Inheritance, the story begins with Murtagh entering the Fulsome Feast tavern in the city of Ceunon. He strikes up a conversation with Essie, the daughter of the owner, who wants to run away. The man Murtagh has been waiting for, Sarros, enters and shows Murtagh a shiny black stone that Murtagh had paid him to find. Sarros, however, betrays Murtagh and threatens him with mercenaries. Despite mysterious magical protections on Sarros and the mercenaries, Murtagh kills them all with a magical fork. Just before dying, Sarros tells Murtagh he was protected by the witch-woman Bachel and the Dreamers, as they have enchanted the bird-skull amulets that prevent them from magical harm. Murtagh leaves the Fulsome Feast, giving his fork to Essie, and contacts the dragon he is bonded with, Thorn.

(This scene from Essie's perspective was part of Paolini's 2018 book The Fork, the Witch, and the Worm.)

Thorn and Murtagh reflect on the stone's origin, having received a warning in Inheritance about places where those stones were from the dragon Umaroth. They decide to leave Ceunon and fly to the city of Gil'ead, where a woman named Ilenna, who may know about Bachel. At Gil'ead, a werecat called Carabel finds Murtagh and tells him that she knows about Bachel. If Murtagh can free Silna, a werecat child held captive by soldiers of Captain Wren's guard, she will tell him. To join Captain Wren's guard and find the child, Murtagh must first kill Muckmaw, a huge fish infesting the nearby waters.

To catch Muckmaw, Murtagh regretfully uses magic to remove a scale from the grave of the dragon Glaedr who Murtagh killed while under hypnosis a year before. Later, he learns the fish's location in nearby Isenstar Lake from sailors, as well as the fact that it was created magically by the Shade Durza, whom Murtagh's brother Eragon slew years before. Once he and Thorn reach the lake, Murtagh sets the scale onto a fishing rod and fishes for Muckmaw. When Muckmaw is caught, Murtagh finds his magic ineffective. After a ferocious battle, Murtagh finally kills Muckmaw and falls unconscious. Upon awakening, he takes the head to Captain Wren and is soon allowed into the guard. That night, Murtagh sneaks into the city's catacombs, encountering magical laboratories and artifacts including the egg of a Ra'zac. When he finds Silna, he must fight his way out, and one of the spellcasters in the guard is revealed to be a Dreamer through a bird-skull amulet. Murtagh flees through some sewers to Carabel, where it is revealed that Silna is the werecat woman's daughter. Carabel allows Murtagh to alert Nasuada, the Queen of the Realm, of Wren's crimes. Carabel then tells Murtagh that Bachel and the Dreamers live far in the North of Alagaësia. Murtagh leaves, considering going to the capital city of Illirea and mounting an expedition to Bachel with Nasuada, whom he also has feelings for.

While leaving Gil'ead, a man named Lyreth recognizes Murtagh and brings him to a secret house where enemies of the new government are hiding. Lyreth then traps him in a room that suffocates Murtagh and prevents him from using magic. Thorn, fearing Murtagh would die, flies into Gil'ead and rips the house apart. However, as he grabs Murtagh, his wings are trapped inside, and his intense claustrophobia, remnants from the trauma he faced from the former king Galbatorix, leads him to lay waste to Gil'ead with fire.

Worried that they cannot face Nasuada after burning Gil'ead, the pair fly to the far north directly, landing in a small valley called Nal Gorgoth. It is filled with ancient buildings, and when Murtagh and Thorn enter they are greeted by Grieve, who brings them to Bachel, who is already aware of them. She is vague about who she is: saying that the Dreamers are the true disciples of the Dreamer Who Dreams. Murtagh is not able to get answers, so once they are given a room in a tower, they sneak out at night and discover that a Forsworn rider named Saerlith went to Nal Gorgoth in the past. Murtagh stays for three days, growing more and more disturbed by what he sees: people having the same dreams, Bachel moving a mountain, and a wounded man being killed by Bachel during a boar hunt. He also befriends a woman named Alín, who loves dragons and is fascinated by Murtagh's talk of the outside world. Seeing that Alín had been whipped for talking to him too much, Murtagh decides to leave and kill his guards along the way. Sidetracked, he investigates a sacred cave, and Bachel and Grieve capture both him and Thorn. Murtagh also discovers Bachel reveals that she has the Dautherdart Niernen, a powerful weapon made to kill dragons, from Inheritance.

Murtagh attempts to resist, but he gives up after torture and is made into a slave with Bachel's magical breath. He lapses in and out of consciousness, befriending another prisoner - an Urgal named Uvek. Bachel teaches him how she and the Dreamers worship Azlagûr the Destroyer, a being who wishes to consume the world when it wakes. After killing a tribe of nomads on Bachel's behalf, Murtagh convinces Alín, disillusioned with Bachel's treatment of Thorn, to leave the drug that keeps him sedated out of his food. Becoming blood brothers, Uvek gives Murtagh a gem with healing energy in it, but Murtagh still cannot use magic. Finally, as Murtagh is about to sacrifice a woman in a demented festival, the drug wears off and he uses magic to kill some worshippers while Thorn destroys Nal Gorgoth's buildings. Chaos ensues, with Bachel fleeing with a captured Alín into the caves. Murtagh kills Lyreth, who is also a Dreamer, and Grieve. Then, Thorn stays with Uvek due to his claustrophobia, and Murtagh runs into the caves to save Alín. He fights several disciples and soon reaches a well, far beneath which he can feel Alín's consciousness. As he goes down small tunnels to that location, he encounters many horrible monsters and kills them with his sword Zar'roc. In a moment of inspiration, he uses the Name of Names to change Zar'roc's name, which meant Misery, to Ithring, which means Freedom. Eventually, Murtagh makes it down to the room where Bachel, Alín, and the twelve disciples are waiting.

Murtagh kills the disciples, throwing them down a hole in the middle of the room, and Bachel finally attacks him. At first, it seems a very lopsided fight, with Bachel overpowering Murtagh using Niernen, but eventually, the room begins to shake around them, and Murtagh kills Bachel by dropping a giant crystal on her. While phasing in and out of consciousness, however, Murtagh uses his mind to feel into the hole in the center of the room, eventually revealing that Azlagûr the destroyer exists at its very bottom. As the room collapses, Uvek and Thorn, Thorn overpowering his claustrophobia, burrows down and saves Murtagh and Alín.

Murtagh then wakes at Illirea, where Nasuada is sheltering Murtagh and Thorn and has taken in Alin as one of her handmaidens. Murtagh tells Nasuada what has happened, and Nasuada asks him to stay in Illirea for a while as he and Thorn prepare to contact Eragon at Mount Arngor and find and face Azlagûr, to which Murtagh agrees.
