= List of The Inheritance Cycle characters =

This is a list of key characters in The Inheritance Cycle, a fantasy adventure series by Christopher Paolini. The series contains several hundred characters, while the following list contains only the most frequently mentioned.

Many of the names Paolini has used originate from Old Norse, German, Old English, and Russian sources, as well as invented languages. With the exception of Angela, the characters' personalities are entirely imagined and not based on actual people. Some characters, like the titular character Eragon were developed before the series was written, while others (such as Angela) were added on an as-needed basis.

== Major characters ==
- Eragon Bromsson – the human son of Brom and the late Selena, although Eragon's true relationship to Brom is not revealed until the third novel. Eragon is the cousin of Roran Garrowsson and half-brother of Murtagh. Until the age of fifteen, he was raised by his uncle Garrow. After the dragon Saphira hatches for him, he travels to the Varden, where he learns of the evils done by Galbatorix and determines to end the king's rule. He has romantic feelings for the elf Arya, but the two never become a couple as he leaves Alagaësia permanently at the end of the final novel. He is also known as Eragon Bromsson, Argetlam, Shur'tugal, Shadeslayer, Firesword, and Kingkiller.

Eragon has dark brown eyes and hair and fights with a bow and arrow or a sword, especially the sword Brisingr, crafted for him by the master smith Rhunön. After a magic ceremony in the second novel, Eragon takes on the physical characteristics of an elf, although he retains some aspects of his human body (such as the ability to grow a beard). He is a skilled magician.
The author originally intended Eragon's character to serve in an autobiographical capacity. However, Paolini states, "Eragon has done many things that I haven’t—such as ride a dragon, fight monsters, and use magic—and these experiences have made him a different person than me. Eragon is now his own person, similar to me in some respects, but possessing a unique history, likes, dislikes, friends, and family." Eragon was the first character developed by Paolini, and the author's outline of how the character would develop drove the novels' storyline. The name "Eragon" is an aptronym based on the word "dragon", and a play on the phrase "an era gone".

Eragon was portrayed by Edward Speleers in the film adaptation of Eragon.

- Saphira Bjartskular ("Brightscales") – a female blue dragon who hatches from an egg stolen from Galbatorix by Brom and Jeod. She is the last living female dragon in all of Alagaësia, although more dragon eggs are found at the end of the final novel. Saphira is wise, fearless, protective of Eragon, and somewhat vain. She is also skilled at aerial acrobatics. Her sire was Iormûngr, a bonded dragon, and her dam was Vervada, a wild dragon. At the end of Inheritance she mates with Fírnen before leaving Alagaësia with Eragon.

Saphira's name is derived from the word "sapphire", and as such serves as an aptronym describing her coloration (blue being Paolini's favorite color). She was voiced by Rachel Weisz in the film.

- Princess Arya Dröttningu – a female elf and is the only daughter of King Evandar and Queen Islanzadí. Arya has served as courier of Saphira's egg and the elves' ambassador to the Varden. She becomes queen of the elves after the death of her mother, as well as a dragon rider (bonded to Fírnen), at the end of the final book. She is also known as Arya Svit-kona and Arya Shadeslayer. Eragon rescues her in the first novel when she is being held captive by Durza, a shade. When Eragon first pursues her romantically, she rebuffs his advances, telling him she had recently lost a close friend, Fäolin, and that any relationship would be unwise because of their respective responsibilities and age differences. She holds traditional human gender roles in disdain. At the end of the final novel, she is willing to consider Eragon as a romantic partner, but he leaves before they can begin a relationship. She shows this by telling her true name to Eragon, which she refused to do before.

Arya is over 100 years old. She is beautiful, wise, and possesses inhuman speed, strength, grace, and superior fighting and magical skills (just like most other elves). She has long black hair, slanted cat-like green eyes, and is very tall.

She was portrayed by Sienna Guillory in the film.

- Murtagh Morzansson – the human son of Morzan and Selena, and Eragon's maternal older half-brother. Eragon first meets him in Eragon and travels with him to the Varden, where he is mistrusted for being Morzan's son. In Eldest, Murtagh is kidnapped by the Twins and forced to serve King Galbatorix after the dragon Thorn hatches for him. He is an exceptionally skilled swordsman, and has enhanced strength and magic from King Galbatorix, as well as Eldunarí (the source of a dragon's very being and vital essence) to drastically enhance his power. Due to his difficult childhood, he has little empathy for others. He has romantic feelings for Nasuada, but does not pursue a relationship as he feels he can never be accepted by society, even after helping to defeat King Galbatorix. His name is entirely the author's invention. Murtagh encounters a cult named Du Eld Draumar in his own book, Murtagh.

Murtagh was played by Garrett Hedlund in the film.

- King Galbatorix – the human monarch and tyrant of the Empire. When his first dragon, Jarnunvösk was killed by Urgals, Galbatorix began a quest for revenge against the Riders which ultimately resulted in their extinction and his rise to power in the human kingdom. He stole a dragon hatchling named Shruikan and bound their minds in a crude approximation of a Rider's bond. He has derived incredible magical strength from the captured souls of dead dragons, the Eldunarí. He is at least 120 years old. He is killed in the final novel. Galbatorix's name means "Big King" in Celtic.

He was played by John Malkovich in the film adaptation of Eragon.

- Nasuada – the daughter of Ajihad and Nadara, human members of the Wandering Tribes. Upon her father's death at the beginning of Eldest, Nasuada becomes leader of the Varden. She is Eragon's liegelord. She allies the Varden with several other groups against the King Galbatorix, and manages to lead them to a victory against him. She is very cunning and trusted by both her people and Eragon, which leads her to become queen of the Empire over her allies in Inheritance.

Nasuada was played by Caroline Chikezie in the film version of Eragon.

- Roran Garrowsson (Stronghammer) – Eragon's cousin and father of Ismira, who grew up with him in Carvahall with Eragon. Roran has an almost obsession with his eventual-wife, Katrina, which leads him to travel with the whole of Alagaësia to join the Varden. He becomes an excellent motivational speaker as a result. Although he at first resents his cousin for inciting war and bringing about Garrow's death, the two make up and become quite close.

Roran was played by Chris Egan in the film Eragon.

- Orik Thrifksson (also known as Grimstborith Orik and King Orik) – a dwarf, a member of the clan Dûrgrimst Ingeitum, and the nephew of King Hrothgar. He becomes king (Grimstnzborith) and leader (Grimstborith) of Ingeitum after Hrothgar's death. Orik is a smith, a warrior, and Eragon's guide. He adopts Eragon into his clan in Eldest. Orik later marries Hvedra, the Grimstcarvlorss of Ingeitum.

== Humans ==
- Brom – Eragon's father and first mentor. He is known for his craftiness, surviving long after his dragon's death despite being hunted by Galbatorix for more than 100 years. Brom was the co-founder of the Varden. He had white hair and a long white beard, carried Morzan's sword Zar'roc, and could work basic magic. He was gruff yet kind towards Eragon. He is revealed to be a former Dragon Rider (bonded to the first Saphira) as he lays dying by the Ra'zac's hand in Eragon. Later, in Brisingr, it is revealed that he was Eragon's father.

Brom was played by Jeremy Irons in the film adaption of Eragon.

- King Orrin – the king of Surda, a minor human empire not yet ruled by Galbatorix. Orrin's royal line comes from the Broddring Kingdom, the human's first empire. He is an enthusiastic scientist, viewed by Nasuada as somewhat childish and undisciplined. Orrin secretly supports the Varden, and he allows them to move to his country in Eldest. He often comes into conflict with Nasuada when she encroaches on what he believes to be his rightful power, and develops a drinking problem in the final novel which she cites as a reason he should not replace Galbatorix.
  - Irwin is the Prime Minister of Surda and opposes King Orrin's open support of the Varden.
- Elva – an orphaned baby whom Eragon attempts to bless in the first novel. From his misworded "blessing" Elva is compelled to protect other people from misfortune or danger. During the battle against Galbatorix, he mutes her and Elva therefore is of no help. However, previous to the battle she proves useful and helps Eragon, Arya, Saphira, and their spellcasters navigate Galbatorix's traps leading up to the throne room. Eragon tried to remove the curse, but failed. As a result, Elva is not forced to help others, but she can still sense their pain.
- Ajihad (AH-zhi-hod) – leader of the Varden and Nasuada's father. He is responsible for the Varden's alliance with the Dwarven nation. Shortly after the Battle of Farthen Dûr, at the beginning of Eldest, he is killed by Urgals.

Ajihad was played by Djimon Hounsou in the film version of Eragon. His name is entirely Paolini's invention.

- Jeod Longshanks is a merchant and scholar. He is an agent of the Varden, whom he supported with his business by smuggling various supplies until he was exposed to the Empire, causing him to suffer heavy losses. He and Brom stole Saphira's egg from the Empire.
- Carvahall villagers
  - Selena – she was the mother of Eragon and Murtagh, Morzan's consort and Garrow's sister. She was also known as The Black Hand (a name which is later used to describe a network of the Empire's spies in the Varden). Selena fell in love with Morzan, who trained her in magic and other warrior arts to act as his spy and assassin. After falling in love with Brom, she escaped to Carvahall to give birth to Eragon, dying shortly after.
  - Garrow was Roran's father (with his deceased wife Marian), Eragon's uncle, and Selena's brother. He lived on a farm, away from the rest of the village. He is killed by the Ra'zac toward the beginning of Eragon.
  - Katrina is the daughter of Sloan and Ismira. She wishes to marry Roran, which causes her disapproving father to kidnap her when he allies himself with the Ra'zac. After Roran, Eragon, and Saphira rescue her, she marries Roran and the two have a child.
    Katrina is portrayed by Tamsin Egerton in the film adaptation. However her scenes were cut in the final version of the film.
    - Ismira is the name of both Katrina's mother (deceased, pre-series) and her daughter born in the final book.
  - Sloan is Carvahall's butcher and Katrina's father. Sloan dotes upon his daughter and is highly possessive of her, betraying the rest of the village to the Empire in exchange for her safety. The Ra'zac blind and torture him. When Eragon meets Sloan after his betrayal, he curses him (with approval from Queen Islanzadí) to go live among the elves and remain separate from his daughter until he repents, and his magically binding true name changes.
  - Horst Ostrecsson is a blacksmith, and husband of Elain and father of Baldor, Albriech, and Hope.
  - Birgit Mardasdaughter, the mother of Nolfavrell, assists Roran during the village's flight from the Empire to Surda. Her husband was Quimby, the village brewer, who was accidentally killed by the Ra'zac's soldiers when he tried to break up an argument in the village's tavern, then eaten by the Ra'zac. Birgit blames Roran and Eragon for his death, and tells Roran she plans to extract a blood price for this insult. When finally given the chance, she decides not to kill him.
- Varden soldiers and magicians
  - The Twins were powerful human magicians who claimed to support the Varden but really worked for Galbatorix.
  - Trianna – After the disappearance of the Twins in Eldest, Trianna leads Du Vrangr Gata, a group of weak human magicians. Trianna is put in charge of Nasuada's plan to use cheap lace, made with magic, to finance the Varden's war efforts. She also leads Du Vrangr Gata in battle.
    - Carn is a spellcaster who serves with Roran throughout the missions in Brisingr and remains a close friend of his. Although not a particularly strong magician, he compensates by inventing extraordinarily clever spells and worming his way into his opponents' minds. Carn is killed in a Wizard's Duel in Inheritance by an enemy magician.
  - Jörmundur is second-in-command of the Varden troops. He is also a member of the Varden's Council of Elders but is the only member to support Nasuada.
    - Martland Redbeard is Roran's commander during his first Varden mission and a tactical genius. After losing a hand, he becomes one of Nasuada's military strategists.
      - Edric is the commander of one of Roran's missions with the Varden. Edric is a competent but overbearing and rigid commander.
    - Captain Brigman is a Varden officer who was sent by Nasuada to conquer the city of Aroughs. After an extended siege, Nasuada, wanting to conquer the city quickly, sent Roran to replace him as commander.
  - Fredric is the Varden's weapon master. He aids Eragon in finding a new sword, a falchion. He wears a suit of pungent ox hide armor, and wields a massive two-handed sword which is over five feet long.
- Lord Barst was a general who was known for his power in battle, said to be just as ruthless as Galbatorix. In book 4, Galbatorix gave him an Eldunari to empower him in battle.
- King Palancar was the king of the humans when they first migrated and established a settlement in Alagaësia. He founded the Broddring Kingdom, but was defeated by the Dragon Riders when he attempted to annex elvish territory. (deceased, pre-series)
- Marcus Tábor was the Lord of Dras–Leona before its siege by the Varden.

== Riders ==
The Dragon Riders are the humans, elves and dwarves who bonded with dragon hatchlings, as well as a kind of police force existing in the time before Galbatorix's rise to power. They began with the first Eragon, an elf who adopted a newly hatched dragon during a massive war between their two species. Their rule ended 100 years before the events of Eragon with the death of Vrael.

- Oromis is Eragon's second teacher after Brom. He is an elf and the last remaining Dragon Rider of the old order. He is also known as "Osthato Chetowa, the Mourning Sage" and "Togira Ikonoka, the Cripple Who is Whole" because of a curse placed upon him by one of the Forsworn. He is bonded to Glaedr.

The Forsworn were a group of 13 Riders (and their dragons) who joined Galbatorix during the Fall. When the dragons learned that thirteen of their kind were willingly helping to exterminate the rest of their race, they banded together and erased the Forsworn's dragons' names and identities. After "The Banishing of the Names" the Forsworn's dragons became beastlike and some of the Forsworn themselves went insane.

  - Morzan was a Dragon Rider, long dead by the start of Eragon; he is actually the father of Murtagh. Brom later killed him with his own sword.
  - Kialandí was a male Rider. (deceased, pre-series)
  - Formora was a female elven Rider. (deceased, pre-series)
  - Glaerun was a male elven rider and one of the Forsworn. He died during a nuclear-like explosion caused by the elven Rider Thuviel sacrificing himself at Doru Areba.
  - Enduriel was a Dragon Rider and one of the Forsworn. It's implied that Enduriel died after the event of the destruction of Ilirea and Vroengard. He may have been killed by Brom or the Varden. (deceased, pre-series)
  - Saerlith was a male human Dragon Rider.(deceased, pre-series)
- Vrael was the last leader of the Riders before their Fall and was bonded to the male white dragon Umaroth.
  - Anurin was an elven Dragon Rider, and leader of the Dragon Riders before Vrael.
- Arva was an elven Rider who was at Ilirea when the Forsworn attacked the city. He fought Kialandí (who dealt him a mortal blow) but managed to pass his sword Támerlein to his sister, Naudra (mate of Lord Fiolr).
- Thuviel was a Dragon Rider whose dragon was killed before the battle of Doru Areba. Crippled by the emotional and psychological effects of losing such a bond, Thuviel became depressed and no longer wished to continue living. Vrael however, encouraged Thuviel to sacrifice himself by turning his body into pure energy. Galbatorix long believed the eggs hidden within the Vault of Souls to have been destroyed in the explosion. Thuviel's sacrifice made Doru Areba uninhabitable for even hundreds of years afterward, akin to the effects of nuclear radiation.

== Dragons ==
In the books, the dragons are grouped into those bonded to Riders and wild dragons. The wild dragons are far more fierce, while the bonded dragons are more intellectual. All dragons hatch from eggs, in which they can remain for a very long time; once hatched they have a nearly infinite lifespan and continue growing their whole lives. They can breathe fire and reproduce at about six months old. When a dragon dies, it has the option to transfer its consciousness into a diamond-like organ inside its body called an Eldunarí. If it disgorges its "heart of hearts" before its death, the dragon has no choice but to retreat into it when it dies. Such Eldunarí will live on until another creature destroys them. Dragons are a variety of colors, which do not appear to be related to their parents' colors.

- Glaedr is the gold dragon bonded to Oromis. He is at least three times as large as Saphira but lost his left foreleg in battle with Formora. After escaping the Forsworn, Glaedr and Oromis went into hiding in Du Weldenvarden to teach the first of the new generation of Riders. He disgorges his Eldunarí shortly before his and Oromis's death in Brisingr, and is thus forced to live on after his body dies.
- Thorn is a red male dragon bound to Murtagh. He has been magically grown to large proportions, but still has the mind of a child. Saphira refers to him as "Red-Shrike-Thorn". Thorn is later revealed to have developed claustrophobia due to Galbatorix’s torture in the Murtagh novel.
- Shruikan is Galbatorix's black dragon, the largest of all the dragons to appear in the series. He was twisted into the king's service through black magic. The dragon's name is a play on the word "shuriken".
  - Jarnunvösk was Galbatorix's first dragon, who was royal purple. She was killed by Urgals (deceased, pre-series).
- Saphira is a female dragon bound to Eragon and a central character of the series. Eragon first encountered her as an egg (believing her to be a rare stone) while hunting in the wilderness of the Spine Mountains early in the first book. Her name is a play on the word "sapphire", due in part to her deep blue coloration.
- Fírnen was one of the eggs that was captured by Galbatorix. His didn't hatch until Arya, his bond, brought him to the Crags of Tael'neir when the war with the Empire had finished. He is a small green dragon and Saphira's mate.
- Bid'daum – the dragon whose egg was found by the first Eragon. (deceased, pre-series)
  - Unnamed, or, He Whose Name Cannot Be Pronounced in any Language, a dragon (whose name "cannot be pronounced in this language or any"), who brokered the peace treaty between the elves and dragns, after Du Fyrn Skulblaka, the Dragon War. (deceased, pre-series)
- Umaroth (pronounced "oo-MAR-oth") was the white dragon bonded to Vrael, leader of the Dragon Riders before their downfall. He speaks for all the Eldunarí in the Vault of Souls.
- Cuaroc served as guardian of the Vault of Souls in a magical automaton body.
- Valdr (meaning "Ruler) is the eldest of the Eldunarí in the Vault of Souls. He gives Eragon a vision where the dreams of starlings are equal to the concerns of kings.
- Belgabad was an enormous, ancient, wild dragon who lived alone in the northern region of Alagaësia. (deceased, pre-series)
- Raugmar The Black was black male wild dragon who was a distant descendant of Belgabad. Raugmar was a great-great-great grandsire of Vervada, Saphira's mother. (deceased, pre-series)
- Azlagur is an ancient, ginormous, and wingless black-scaled dragon. He is worshipped by the cult Du Eld Draumar, who give him many titles, including Azlagur the Firstborn, Azlagur the Devourer, and Azlagur the Dreamer. Murtagh feels what may be his conscience, which is incredibly vast.

== Elves ==
The elves are one of the oldest races, but not native to Alagaësia. They came from a land called Alalea. They are very gifted in magic and live in the forest called Du Weldenvarden.

- Queen Islanzadí is queen of the elves until her death in the final novel. She lives in the elven capital Ellesméra. She is the widow of the former king of the elves, Evandar, and the mother of Arya.
  - King Evandar was the mate of Islanzadí and Arya's father. He was ruler of Du Weldenvarden before Islanzadí was. He died in the elves' and Riders' final siege of Urû'baen. (deceased, pre-series)
  - Queen Tamunora was the elven queen who worked with the dragons to create the pact that would lead to the formation of the Dragon Riders, ending Du Fyrn Skulblaka.(deceased, pre-series)
  - Queen Dellanir was queen of the elves when Anurin decided to add humans to the pact so that there would be human Dragon Riders. (deceased, pre-series)
  - Lord Däthedr is a counselor of Islanzadi.
  - Lord Fiolr is Arya's friend and leader of Sílthrim. He is well trained in magic. It is implied that he fought at Ceunon and Gil'ead. He lives in the House of Valtharos. He is the owner of Támerlein, one of the last swords of the Dragon Riders that was his wife's brother's sword. Later in Inheritance, Arya adopts this sword (with a few modifications) after she becomes a rider.
- Rhunön is an ancient elf who created all of the Dragon Riders' swords. After the betrayal of the Forsworn, Rhunön swore never to make another sword. In Brisingr, Eragon works with her to circumvent that oath and forge his sword Brisingr.
- Blödhgarm (translated in an appendix as "Bloodwolf") is an elf who has magically edited his body to appear beast-like. He is the leader of a small group sent to protect Eragon and Saphira.
  - Wyrden was a powerful elven spellcaster under Blödhgarm.
- Vanir is a (comparatively) young elf, who is Eragon's sparring partner during his training in Eldest. He is cocky and dismissive of Eragon until the latter's transformation during the Blood-Oath Celebration. His name comes from the group of Norse gods known as the Vanir, associated with fertility and prophecy.

== Dwarves ==
The dwarves are one of the humanoids native to Alagaësia. Their mythology holds that they were born from the rock of the mountains there.

- King Hrothgar – the King of the dwarves, controlling the thirteen dwarf clans and Tronjheim, the city within Farthen Dûr. He admits Eragon as a member of Dûrgrimst Ingeitum, an honor that had never previously been bestowed upon a non-dwarf. He is killed with magic by Murtagh in the Battle of the Burning Plains. His name comes from that of a legendary Danish king who lived in the 6th century and who appears as a character in the Anglo-Saxon epics Beowulf and Widsith. He is succeeded by his nephew Orik.
- Vermûnd is the Grimstborith of Az Sweldn rak Anhûin, a clan that lost everything during the Fall. Vermûnd orders the assassination of Eragon when he stays in Tronjheim during Brisingr. Because of his crime, Az Sweldn rak Anhûin are banished from the dwarves by Orik and the other clan chiefs until Vermûnd is replaced. Vermûnd himself is branded a traitor and shall be ignored until he dies.
- Gannel Ormsson is Grimstborith ("clan chief") of Dûrgrimst Quan, the religious clan of the dwarves. He is also the head priest of the dwarves. He gives Eragon a necklace that will prevent anyone from scrying him. He supports Grimstborith Nado for the dwarven kingship, and later summons the chief dwarf god, Gûntera.
- Korgan was the first dwarf king. He discovered Farthen Dûr while tunneling for gold. (deceased, pre-series)
- Ûndin Derûndsson Grimstborith of Dûrgrimst Ragni Hefthyn — "the River Guard", host of Eragon's party in Tarnag. He original voted for Gannel as the dwarves new king, but switched his vote to Grimstborith Nado under Gannel's orders.
- Hadfala is Grimstborith of Dûrgrimst Ebardac. She original supported Gannel as king, but converted her vote to Orik after the attempt on Eragon's life.

== Other characters and creatures ==
- Angela is a fortune teller, herbalist, witch, and a friend of Eragon's. She is accompanied by a werecat named Solembum. She makes most of her living by fortune-telling for the richer people of Teirm and selling potions. It is implied that she is not entirely human and has lived for an incredibly long time.

Her character is loosely based on Paolini's sister.

Angela is portrayed by Joss Stone in the film Eragon.

- Werecats are sentient creatures who can shapeshift between what appears to be a small, childlike human form and a lynx-like cat form. They are wise, magical, and have mild prophetic abilities. They get along very well with dragons.
  - Solembum is a werecat who journeys with Angela. In Teirm, he gives Eragon an important prophecy: "When the time comes and you need a weapon, look under the roots of the Menoa tree. Then, when all seems lost and your power is insufficient, go to the rock of Kuthian and speak your name to open the Vault of Souls". Solembum has red (sometimes blue or yellow) eyes and his ears are tipped with black tufts when in cat form; as a human, he appears as a small dark-haired boy and fights with a dagger.
  - Grimrr Half-Paw - the werecat's current "king".
  - Maud is a werecat that lives in Ellesméra and is a friend of Solembum.
  - Carabel is a werecat who lives in the court of the lord of Gil’ead. She sends Murtagh on a quest to save a kidnapped a werecat child named Silna (who’s later revealed to be her daughter), in exchange for information about the Draumar.
  - Silna is the kidnapped daughter of Carabel.
- The Ra'zac are extremely powerful beings of indeterminate origins who work for Galbatorix, in exchange for a supply of human flesh. They arrived in Alagaesia from the land the humans had migrated from; the Riders tried but failed to exterminate them. They have evolved to be the perfect human predators. It is impossible to sense their life force, which made it easier to sneak up on riders and kill them. Similar to insects, the Ra'zac have a three-staged life: first as eggs, then as humanoid youngsters and finally, after the first full moon of their twentieth year, they shed their skin and become huge beasts called the Lethrblaka.

The Ra'zac are killed in the movie, but remain alive until Brisingr in the novels (although some Ra'zac eggs are later discovered in the final novel).

- Urgals – large, grey-skinned, horned humanoids. Although they are first considered beasts, Eragon later learns that the Urgals are as sentient and capable as humans, elves, or dwarves. Despite living in remote matriarchal mountain villages, the social rank and sexual attractiveness of males is determined by the number of foes they have vanquished, which leads to conflict with neighboring humans. They make a pact with Galbatorix to fight for him in exchange for more land sometime before the events of Eragon; when the king fails to deliver, they join the Varden. Urgals who grow to more than eight feet tall are considered 'Kull', and make up the Urgals' elite force of warriors. The Urgal race and the Kull were invented entirely by the author.
  - Nar Garzhvog is a Kull warlord and brilliant strategist. He fights in the Battle of the Burning Plains and accompanies Eragon on a later journey to the foot of the Beor Mountains. Garzhvog hopes that, after Galbatorix's defeat, some kind of treaty and athletic contests can be established between the Urgals and humans to avert future conflict between their races.
  - Yarbog is an Urgal who challenges the authority of Roran (his commander) during a mission. Roran defeats him in an unarmed combat wrestling match and earns his respect.
- Shades are humanoid sorcerers possessed by spirits. They wish to kill all other living things and can only be killed by stabbing them directly through the heart. They briefly are vanquished if they receive a normally mortal wound.
  - Durza the shade, works for Galbatorix hunting down the new Rider Eragon and extracting information from Arya in the first book. He is killed by Eragon, but not before seriously wounding the Rider.
    Durza is portrayed by Robert Carlyle in the film Eragon.
  - Varaug is the Shade created by three magicians using the body of a soldier during the siege on the city of Feinster in the third book. He is killed by Arya.
- Du Eld Draumar (meaning “The Old Dreamers" in the ancient language) are a cult who worships the dragon Azlagur. They live far in the north, and consist of humans, dwarves, and possibly some Urgals. It is hinted at that the Draumar have secretly being controlling events in Alagaësia for thousands of years, and even possibly controlling King Galbatorix. They are controlled by a “Speaker” who carries out the will of Azlagur.
  - Bachel was a half-elf and Speaker for the Draumar. She acts as the main antagonist in Murtagh. Bachel is a powerful spell caster, and uses a gas called “The Breath of Azlagur” to incapacitate foes.
  - Grieve was a high-ranking member of the Draumar. He was perpetually in a bad mood.
- The Menoa Tree is one of the oldest and largest trees in Du Weldenvarden. The tree is the spirit of the elf Linnëa, who imbued her consciousness into the tree after being jilted by a lover. Linnëa was an elf who lived before the war between elves and dragons, when they first migrated to the new land.
- Blagden is a raven blessed by Evandar for pecking out an Urgal's eyes when the elf king stumbled during a fight, allowing him to recover and defeat the Urgal. The magic gave Blagden the ability to speak (though he primarily speaks in riddles) and see the future, but also unintentionally turned his feathers pure white. Blagden's name is an Old English name meaning "the dark/black valley".
- The five creatures of the Beor mountains are five unique species living only in the mountain range, for which five dwarf clans are named.
  - Feldûnost are large goat-like creatures used as mounts and to produce dairy. Their name means "frostbeard" in the dwarf language.
  - Nagra are giant boars hunted by the dwarves.
  - Fanghur are rare creatures that resemble dragons, though not as large or intelligent as their cousins, and are unable to breathe fire. They are considered to be the most deadly of the native Beor creatures through the way they hunt, by letting out piercing screams or to attack their victim's minds to paralyze them while they go in for the kill. Three attack Saphira in the second novel.
  - Shrrg are giant wolves.
  - Urzhad (called Beorn by the elves) are massive cave bears that grow to a large size. Urzhad are larger than most Beor creatures, about as big as a small house.
