= Brisingr =

2008 book by Christopher Paolini

- The English cover of Brisingr, featuring the golden dragon Glaedr
- Author: Christopher Paolini
- Illustrator: John Jude Palencar
- Cover artist: John Jude Palencar
- Language: English
- Series: The Inheritance Cycle
- Release number: 3
- Genre: Young adult literature, high fantasy
- Publisher: Alfred A. Knopf
- Publication date: September 20, 2008
- Publication place: United States
- Media type: Print (hardcover and paperback) and audio-CD
- Pages: 831
- ISBN: 978-0739368046
- Preceded by: Eldest
- Followed by: Inheritance

Brisingr (or The Seven Promises of Eragon Shadeslayer and Saphira Bjartskular) /brɪsɪŋər/ is the third novel in The Inheritance Cycle by Christopher Paolini. It was released on September 20, 2008. Originally, Paolini intended to conclude the then Inheritance Trilogy in three books, but during writing the third book he decided that the series was too complex to conclude in one book, because the single book would be close to 1,500 pages long. A deluxe edition of Brisingr, which includes removed scenes and previously unseen art, was released on October 13, 2009.

Brisingr focuses on the story of Eragon and his dragon Saphira as they continue their quest to overthrow the corrupt ruler of the Empire, Galbatorix. Eragon is one of the last remaining Dragon Riders, a group that governed the fictional continent of Alagaësia, where the series takes place. Brisingr begins almost immediately after the preceding novel Eldest concludes.

Published by Alfred A. Knopf Books for Young Readers, an imprint of Random House Children's Books, the book sold 550,000 copies on its first day of sale, a record for a Random House children's book. The novel debuted at number one on USA Today's top 150 bestsellers list. Reviewers criticized the book for its length, while commenting on Paolini's growing maturity in his treatment of characters.

== Plot ==
=== Setting and characters ===
Brisingr begins about three days after the events in Eldest conclude. It continues the story of The Inheritance Cycle and takes place on the fictional continent of Alagaësia during a struggle for power as the small country Surda and a rebel group called the Varden attempts to overthrow the larger Broddring Empire, ruled by the evil King Galbatorix. They are supported mainly by elves, dwarves, and Urgals, but the Empire is populated with large numbers of humans, who far outnumber Surda and its allies. The Inheritance Cycle focuses on the story of a teenage boy named Eragon and his dragon Saphira. Eragon is one of the few remaining Dragon Riders, a group that governed Alagaësia in past times but were almost destroyed by a Rider named Galbatorix, who took control of the land. Galbatorix's greatest fear is that a new Rider will rise up and usurp his position as king of the Empire.

Brisingr is told in third-person from the perspectives of multiple primary protagonists. These characters include the humans Eragon, Roran, and Nasuada, and the dragons Saphira and Glaedr. The humans Galbatorix and Murtagh return as antagonists, along with Murtagh's dragon, Thorn. The Ra'zac return for a minor antagonist role, and Varaug, a Shade, also appears for a minor antagonist role. Many minor characters reprise their roles in Brisingr from previous installments of The Inheritance Cycle, including the elves Arya, Islanzadí, and Oromis; the dwarf Orik; the humans Angela, Katrina and Elva; and the dragon Glaedr.

=== Plot summary ===
Eragon, Saphira, and Roran travel to Helgrind, the home of the Ra'zac. There, they rescue Roran's betrothed, Katrina, held prisoner there, and kill one of the Ra'zac. Saphira, Roran, and Katrina return to the Varden, while Eragon stays behind. Eragon slays the remaining Ra'zac, who warns him that Galbatorix has discovered "the name". Eragon also finds and condemns Sloan, Katrina's treacherous father, to never meet his daughter again, and arranges for him to travel to Ellesmera, the elven homeland.

Eragon then travels back to the Varden, after reuniting with Arya, who had come in search of him. Once they return to the Varden, Eragon discovers that Katrina is pregnant with Roran's child and a wedding is arranged, which Eragon is to conduct. Just before it begins, a small force of troops attack alongside Murtagh and his dragon, Thorn. The soldiers had spells cast on them that removed their ability to feel pain, making them better fighters. Elven spell-casters aid Eragon and Saphira and cause Murtagh and Thorn to flee, winning the battle. After the fight, Roran marries Katrina.

The leader of the Varden, Nasuada, orders Eragon to attend the election of the new dwarf king in the Beor Mountains, while Saphira stays behind to protect the Varden. Eragon is to support the bid of Orik, the former king's adoptive son, who favors the Varden. Eragon heads to Farthen Dur, where the election takes place. Once there, Eragon is the target of an assassination attempt, perpetrated by a Rider-hating dwarf clan, whom Orik forces into exile. Having earned the sympathies of the dwarves, Orik is elected the new king. Saphira journeys to Farthen Dur for Orik's coronation and repairs Isidar Mithrim, the previously destroyed star rose.

After Orik's coronation, Eragon and Saphira journey to Ellesméra to learn the secret of Galbatorix's power. There, they learn that Eragon's deceased mentor, Brom, was Eragon's father, and not the Forsworn Morzan as Murtagh had thought, though they both share the same mother. Glaedr also reveals the source of Galbatorix's power: Eldunari, a dragon organ, which allows its holder to communicate with and draw energy from the dragon it belongs to, even if the dragon is deceased. Galbatorix spent years collecting Eldunari, drawing his power from the dragons he slew.

After some training, Eragon visits Rhunön, the elven blacksmith who forged swords for Riders. Rhunön refuses to forge Eragon a new sword, having sworn to never create a weapon again, and having depleted her stocks of the required metal. By deciphering the werecat Solembum's instructions, Eragon acquires the metal from under the roots of the Menoa Tree. Rhunön forges him a sword by controlling Eragon's body, and he names it "Brisingr", which causes it to burst into flames whenever its name is said aloud.

Oromis and Glaedr decide to join the battle against the Empire alongside Islanzadí. To prevent Galbatorix from claiming his Eldunari should he fall in combat, and to continue guiding Eragon, Glaedr gives his Eldunari to Eragon. Glaedr and Oromis fly to Gil'ead, while Eragon and Saphira fly to Feinster, a city sieged by the Varden.

Meanwhile, Roran is sent on various missions as a soldier of the Varden. One mission against soldiers that can't feel pain results in many casualties, and in Roran being assigned to an incompetent commander. During another mission, this commander almost causes the entire force to be decimated. Roran takes charge of a small group of soldiers loyal to him, and leads them to victory against overwhelming odds. Despite this, Roran is charged with insubordination and is flogged as a punishment. Afterwards, Nasuada promotes Roran to commander and sends his unit on a mission with both men and Urgals, to enforce the idea of men and Urgals working together. When an Urgal, Yarbog, challenges Roran for leadership of the unit, he wrestles him into submission. After returning to the Varden, his squad joins the siege of Feinster.

As the siege begins, Eragon rescues Arya and departs to find the leader of the city, but discovers three magicians attempting to create a Shade. While attempting to kill the magicians, Eragon has a vision through Glaedr's Eldunarí showing him and Oromis fighting Murtagh and Thorn in the sky. During the fight, Galbatorix takes control of Murtagh, and tries to lure Oromis to his side. Failing to do so, he slays Oromis as he suffers a seizure. Glaedr, in grief, is also killed. After the vision, the magicians succeed in creating the Shade Varaug. Eragon and Arya fight and slay Varaug, with Arya dealing the fatal blow. After the successful siege, Eragon resolves to continue the fight against the Empire, to avenge Oromis and Glaedr.

== Background ==
=== Writing ===
The first two books in the Inheritance Cycle, Eragon and Eldest, sold over 15 million copies worldwide together. Alfred A. Knopf Books for Young Readers, an imprint of Random House Children's Books and the publisher of the books, prepared Brisingr's release by printing 2.5 million copies in advance, Random House's biggest initial print run of a children's book. Paolini said he tried not to let the expectations surrounding Brisingr affect him, stating that "As an author, I found that I can't really allow myself to think about those things. I actually fell into that trap with the first part of Brisingr. I sat there and I started obsessing about every single word." He turned away from his computer and began writing on parchment paper instead. The pages were rewritten on a computer document afterwards by his mother.

Unlike Eragon, Brisingr features multiple points of view. Parts of the book are written in Saphira's perspective for the first time in the series. Paolini based the dragon's behavior and attitude on the pets and animals he grew up around, particularly his pet cats: "I thought a dragon would be like a cat in some ways, that same sort of self-satisfied attitude." He added that it was challenging to depict scenes from the standpoint of a dragon, but he enjoyed doing it because Saphira "has so many interesting thoughts and opinions."

The Ancient Language used by the elves in the Inheritance Cycle is partly based on Old Norse. The word brisingr is an ancient Old Norse word meaning "fire", which Paolini found while reading through a dictionary of word origins. Paolini said he "loved it so much, he decided to base the rest of [the Ancient Language] on Old Norse. To find more words, I went online and dug up dictionaries and guides to the language. I invented more words based on what I learned and then formed a system of grammar and a pronunciation guide to fit my world. Developing this has probably been the most difficult part of writing the books." The languages used by the dwarves and Urgals in the book were created from scratch by Paolini.

When asked by Sci Fi Wire what kind of challenges he faced while writing the book, Paolini said it was trying to avoid any references to modern items or actions. Brisingr takes place long before the Industrial Revolution, which Paolini said "limits not only the things my characters use and do, but it also informs their worldview. This constraint extends to more recent words and phrases as well. For example, in Brisingr, I was going to use the description short-order. When I researched its origins, however, I discovered that it was coined to describe modern cooking: a short-order cook."

=== Split and editing ===
"A few chapters into Brisingr when Eragon and Roran have attacked Helgrind where the Ra'zac are, [...] Eragon encounters a moral quandary and in order to resolve it in a way that felt consistent to [his] character, I ended up adding about a hundred pages to the book. [...] I like big books, but there is a point when it gets too big [...] At that point I began to realize that [...] maybe the Inheritance Trilogy should become the Inheritance Cycle, and instead of three books it should be four books."

— Christopher Paolini

According to its author, Brisingr features a complex story with "weighty moral dilemmas" and "a sheer number of events that gives it a rich narrative." Halfway through the writing of the book, Paolini realized the story was so complex that it was going to end up being 2,000 pages. He decided to split it into two books, and thus the Inheritance Trilogy became the Inheritance Cycle. Paolini revealed this decision in an October 2007 press release, and stated that his development as a writer since Eragon is what caused the book to become so complex.

The decision to bring in and then kill a Shade at the end of the book was made when Paolini realized he needed a new ending for the book after it was split up. He was in need of plot points that were strong enough to keep the reader interested through the ending of the book. The point of view of Glaedr and Oromis' confrontation with Thorn and Murtagh was combined with the Shade battle to further keep the reader interested.

The first draft of the book was finished in April 2008. In a newsletter sent out that month, Paolini said he was busy "chewing [his] way through the editing, which has been a surprisingly enjoyable experience this time around." The hardest part of editing was having to excise material that he spent days and weeks working on. "However, as most any writer will tell you, just because you spent ten days slaving over a certain scene is no reason to keep it in the final manuscript. The only question that matters is whether the scene contributes to the book as a whole," he said. Michelle Frey, executive editor at Alfred A. Knopf who worked with Paolini on Eragon and Eldest, assisted Paolini as the editor of Brisingr.

=== Title, cover, and audio book ===
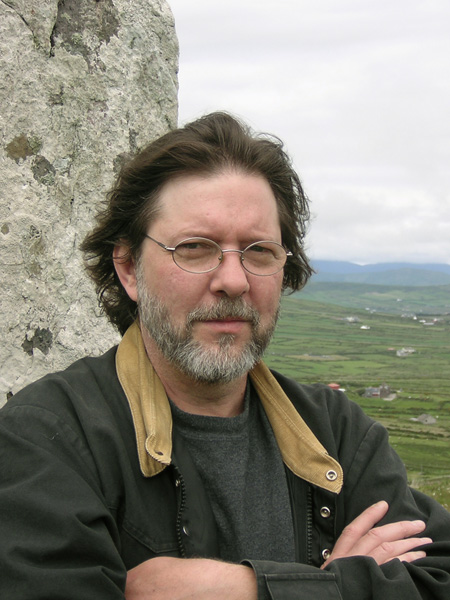
John Jude Palencar illustrated the cover of Brisingr.

Paolini said "Brisingr" was one of the first words he thought of for the book's title, as it was the first Ancient Language word that Eragon learned in the series, and it holds a particular significance for him. Unlike the first two books in the series, Brisingr has a subtitle: The Seven Promises of Eragon Shadeslayer and Saphira Bjartskular. Paolini revealed it in a newsletter at his official website, in which he said that it was added "because I felt it suited the story, and also because, in a way, I still view Brisingr and Book Four as two halves of the same volume; the subtitle is merely the name of the first of these two sections."

John Jude Palencar illustrated the English cover featuring the golden dragon Glaedr. The content of the cover was one of the few things initially confirmed by Paolini before he wrote the book. He had originally planned for it to feature a green dragon, but later indicated that this was affected by the expansion of the series to a four-book cycle. Paolini liked the cover because it reflects that Brisingr is the longest and "most intense entry in the series so far." The Japanese translation of Brisingr was so large that the publisher split it into two volumes. Since they did not want the same cover on two volumes, they commissioned Palencar to paint one of the Lethrblaka for the second volume. The Lethrblaka are the Ra'zac's steeds and parents. Paolini made drawings based on the book for the deluxe edition of Brisingr, including one with Eragon's arm and hand holding the sword he receives in the book. The sword, named Brisingr, has flames around its blade.

Gerard Doyle provided the voice for the English audio book of Brisingr. In order to help Doyle with this, Paolini recorded the pronunciation of every invented name and word in Brisingr from a list over nine pages long. It was tricky even for Paolini to do this because he cannot "roll [his] r's" properly. Doyle said he prepared for narrating Brisingr by going "largely by physical description. If there are specific details about the voices, I latch onto those as best I can. But if a creature’s anatomical features are described, I try to imagine, for example, how the jaw might work...and then try and adapt that and attach it to something that sounds okay to the ear and is still slightly stranger than normal."

== Promotion and release ==
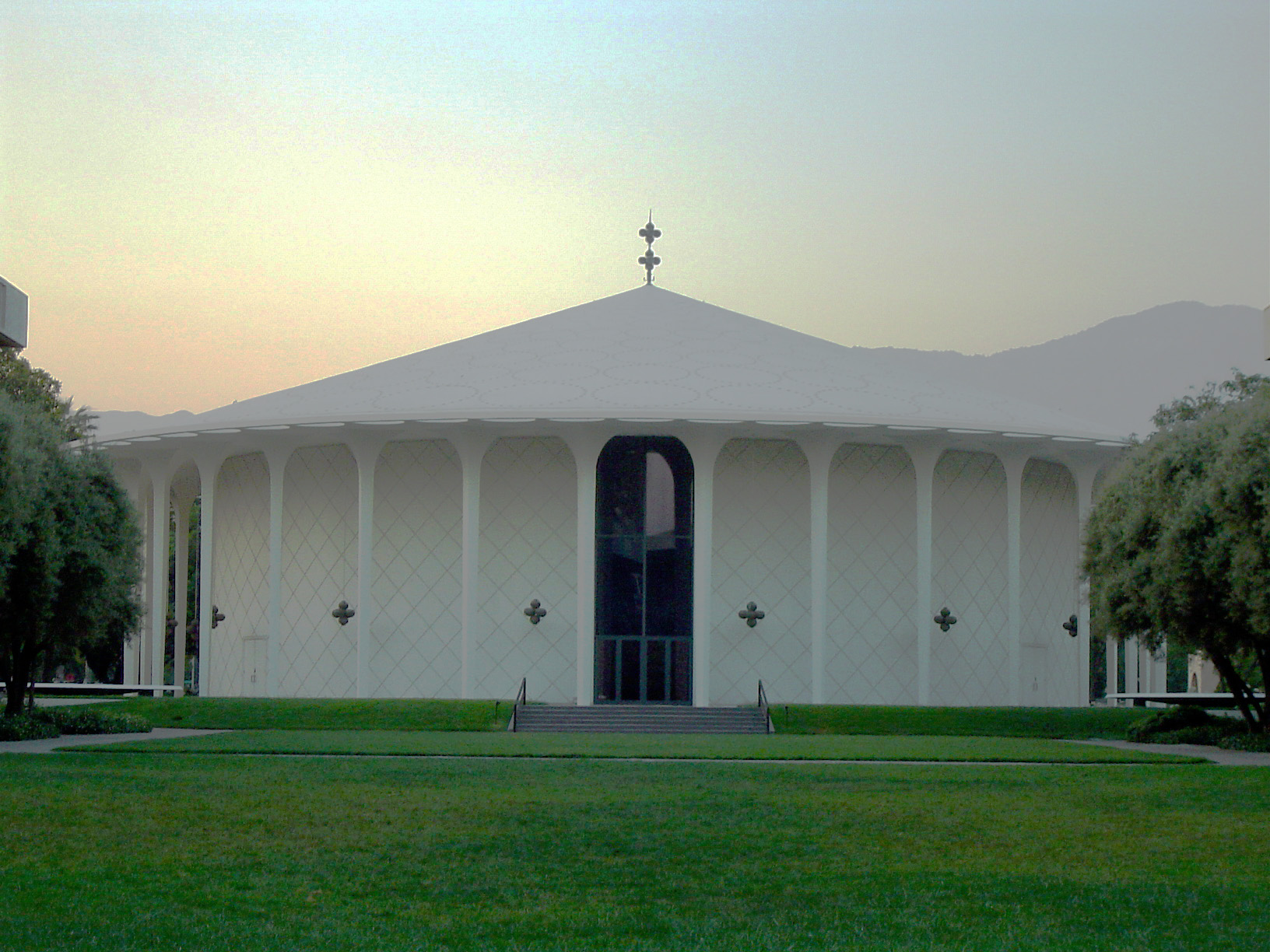
Paolini visited the Beckman auditorium at Caltech during his book tour to promote Brisingr.

In March 2008, a spoiler about the book was released on the Inheritance Cycle's official website, stating that "In Brisingr, Eragon will meet a god." In May 2008, Paolini posted a video message on his website stating that in the book, Eragon will meet "a new, rather terrifying enemy" that "likes to laugh, but not in a good way." A third and final spoiler was released by Paolini in July 2008, stating that one of the characters will become pregnant in the book. Excerpts from Brisingr were released both on the official Inheritance Cycle website and on MSNBC, which held an interview with Paolini the day before the release of the book. Paolini toured across ten cities in the North America to promote the book; his first visit was to New York City on September 19, 2008, and his last was to Bozeman on November 22, 2008.

Brisingr was released in the United States, Canada, Australia, New Zealand, Singapore, and the United Kingdom on September 20, 2008, though it was originally supposed to be released on September 23, 2008. Nancy Hinkel, publishing director of Alfred A. Knopf Books for Young Readers, said the company received "an outpouring of requests from booksellers hoping to host midnight launch parties. We have responded to their enthusiasm by advancing the date, and we know fans will welcome the opportunity to celebrate the publication together." More than 2,500 midnight party events were held in the United States for the September 20 release. A deluxe edition of Brisingr was released on October 13, 2009, including deleted scenes, foldout posters, never-before-seen art by the author, and a guide to dwarf runes.

Brisingr sold 550,000 copies in North America on its first day of an initial print run of 2.5 million copies. Both the initial print run and first-day sales were the largest ever for the Random House Children's Book division. Brisingr sold 45,000 copies on its first day in the United Kingdom and was the fastest-selling children's book in the country in 2008. In Australia, the book sold 141,000 copies in 2008, making it one of the country's top ten best-selling books of the year. Brisingr debuted at number one on USA Today's top 150 bestsellers list. It stayed on the list for 25 consecutive weeks until March 3, 2009.

== Critical reception ==
Brisingr received mixed to positive reviews, with critical reviewers commenting on the book's length and Paolini's growing maturity in his treatment of characters. David Durham of The Washington Post gave the novel a moderately negative review, praising Paolini for his streamlined prose, but saying the novel loses focus in the middle. He added, though, that Brisingr "reconnects with the core elements that animate Eragon's tale" toward the end of the book, and Paolini shows growing maturity during some "quiet" moments in Brisingr, although Durham noted these parts could bore younger readers. Durham also found that Paolini's new characters are original, and that Paolini added depth to some characters from the previous novels in the Inheritance Cycle. In contrast, Sheena McFarland of The Salt Lake Tribune said that Paolini "hasn't learned how to create characters that readers can relate to," although she praised him for strong female characters in Brisingr such as Arya and Nasuada. McFarland calls the last fifty pages "riveting", but says they are a "paltry reward for trudging through the 700 preceding pages."

Publishers Weekly gave Brisingr a negative review, criticizing the novel for relying on "classic fantasy tropes", and noting that Brisingr might appeal to younger readers, but older readers might be unimpressed. Voice of Youth Advocates (VOYA) reviewer Kathleen Beck criticized the length of the book, accusing Paolini of "plainly [enjoying] wandering around in his fantasy world" and urging him to provide a cleaner finish to the series. She further criticized the content of the book, asserting that "there is a lot of action in [Brisingr] but paradoxically not much forward motion." Haley Keeley of The Buffalo News, however, commented that with alternating points of views every few chapters, Paolini "manages to convey the complexity of the situation while offering refreshing new perspectives." Children's Literature writer Jamie Hain gave the book a positive review, praising the action scenes, as well as the appeal to both male and female readers. She asserts that it is a "long read", but it is "worth it for those who reach the end."
