= Eldest =

2005 book by Christopher Paolini

- Cover of USA first edition, featuring the red dragon Thorn
- Author: Christopher Paolini
- Illustrator: John Jude Palencar
- Cover artist: John Jude Palencar
- Language: English
- Series: The Inheritance Cycle
- Release number: 2
- Genre: Young adult fiction Fantasy; Bildungsroman
- Publisher: Alfred A. Knopf
- Publication date: August 23, 2005
- Publication place: United States
- Media type: Print (Hardcover and Paperback) and audio-CD
- Pages: 694 (hardcover edition)
- ISBN: 0-375-82670-X (hardcover edition)
- OCLC: 58919923
- Dewey Decimal: [Fic] 22
- LC Class: PZ7.P19535 El 2005
- Preceded by: Eragon
- Followed by: Brisingr

Eldest is the second novel in The Inheritance Cycle by Christopher Paolini and the sequel to Eragon. It was first published in hardcover on August 23, 2005, and was released in paperback in September 2006. Eldest has been released in an audiobook format, and as an ebook. Like Eragon, Eldest became a New York Times bestseller. A deluxe edition of Eldest was released on September 26, 2006, including new information and art by both the illustrator and the author. Other editions of Eldest are translated into different languages.

Eldest begins following several important events in Eragon. The story is the continued adventures of Eragon and his dragon Saphira, centering on their journey to the realm of the Elves in order to further Eragon's training as a Dragon Rider. Other plots in the story focus on Roran, Eragon's cousin, who leads the inhabitants of Carvahall to Surda to join the Varden, and Nasuada as she takes on her father's role as leader of the Varden.

Reviews pointed out the similarities between Eldest and other works such as The Lord of the Rings, while praising the themes of the book, such as friendship and honor. Several of these reviews commented on the style and genre of Eldest, while others considered the possibility of a film adaptation similar to the first film.

== Plot synopsis ==
=== Setting ===
Eldest begins three days after the events of the preceding novel, Eragon, in the dwarf city of Tronjheim, inside of a hollowed mountain named Farthen Dûr. Farthen Dûr is in the southeastern part of Alagaësia, the fictional continent where The Inheritance Cycle takes place. Throughout the novel, the protagonists travel to many different places: Ellesméra, the elven capital city in the forest Du Weldenvarden, on the northern portion of Alagaësia; Carvahall, a small town located on the northwestern part of Alagaësia in Palancar Valley; and Aberon, the capital of Surda, in the southern portion of Alagaësia.

=== Characters ===
The story is told in third-person through protagonists Eragon, Roran, and Nasuada. Eragon is nearly always accompanied by his dragon Saphira. Due to the multiple points-of-view, multiple stories take place concurrently, and the protagonist characters do not meet often. Several other characters return from Eragon, including Arya (the elf warrior, daughter of the elven queen), Orik, Roran (Eragon's cousin and a major character), Ajihad (the leader of the Varden, who dies and is replaced by his daughter Nasuada), and Angela (the herbalist). Some new characters are introduced in Eldest, including King Orrin of Surda, as well as Oromis and his dragon Glaedr.

=== Plot ===
Eldest begins as Ajihad, the leader of the rebel Varden force, is ambushed and killed, while The Twins and Murtagh are assumed dead. Ajihad's daughter Nasuada is elected to command the Varden, and decides to move them to Surda and oppose the Empire openly. Eragon and Saphira decide to travel to the forest Du Weldenvarden to be trained as a Dragon Rider by the elves. The dwarf king, Hrothgar, adopts Eragon to his clan and has his now foster brother, Orik, accompany him to the forest. There, Eragon meets the stranger who had contacted him, revealed to be a Rider, Oromis, with his Dragon Glaedr, the only Dragon and Rider secretly alive. However, both are crippled, and so cannot fight Galbatorix directly, choosing to pass on their knowledge. Eragon and Saphira are taught the use of logic, magic theory, scholarship, and combat, among other things.

However, having received a back injury in the previous book, Eragon is beset by agonizing seizures, which debilitate him. He also struggles with his romantic feelings for Arya, while Saphira has similar struggles toward Glaedr. Arya becomes aware of his feelings, and distances herself from him, while Saphira is violently rejected by Glaedr, though the two come to an understanding afterwards. Eventually, in an ancient elven ceremony, the Agaetí Blödhren, Eragon is affected by powerful magic, turning him into an elf-human hybrid, and healing his back injury. He makes another romantic attempt on Arya, but she gently rejects him, and leaves to rejoin the Varden.

Meanwhile, unknowing of all of this, Eragon's cousin Roran, returning home after hearing of his father's death, plans to marry Katrina, daughter of Sloan, the village butcher, while the village is unexpectedly attacked by Galbatorix's soldiers and the Ra'zac, who had killed Garrow. Roran fights the soldiers with a hammer, which becomes his signature weapon while the entire village mounts a defence, during which Roran proposes to Katrina, but ignites a feud between himself and Sloan in the process. One night, Roran wakes up to find Katrina being taken by the Ra'zac, who sneaked into the house. They seriously injure him and capture Katrina. Sloan, revealed to be in league with the Ra'zac, is then knocked out and flown away by them, along with Katrina, on their mounts and parents, the Lethrblaka.

Torn between chasing after Katrina and staying behind to defend his home, Roran rallies almost the entirety of the village to travel to Surda and join the Varden. On the way, they journey to Teirm, where Roran meets Jeod, Brom's friend, who informs him about Eragon, and decides to go with them. With Jeod's help, they steal a ship, and journey toward Surda by sea.

In Surda, Nasuada collaborates with King Orrin while facing the burden of leadership. She hatches a plan to fund them by selling magically crafted lace, to alleviate their financial troubles. She also meets Elva, a child supposedly blessed by Eragon in the previous book. Eragon is revealed to have botched the blessing with poor phrasing, accidentally forcing Elva to feel the pain of others. Elva uses her abilities to save Nasuada from an assassination attempt. Nasuada eventually learns that Galbatorix is fielding a massive army against them, and sends for help from the dwarves and Eragon.

Eragon has a prophetic dream of the coming battle, and decides to interrupt his training to aid the Varden in battle. Oromis consents and provides him with numerous gifts to help him, but insists he return to finish his training after the battle. He journeys with Saphira and Orik to the Varden's camp, reuniting with Nasuada and Arya, and meeting Elva, promising to rid her of his failed blessing and reconciling with Arya. The Varden are then joined by an army of Urgals, led by Nar Garzhvog, who seek an alliance with them after being freed of Durza's control.

As the battle begins, it goes poorly for the massively outnumbered Varden. Roran and the dwarves arrive mid-battle, and begin to turn the tide in favor of the Varden, but an unknown Dragon Rider unexpectedly arrives and kills Hrothgar. Eragon engages this Rider, who proves an even match, and unmasks him, revealing him to be Murtagh. Murtagh reveals he was kidnapped by the Twins, who had betrayed the Varden. After the dragon, named Thorn, had hatched for him, they were both forced into swearing loyalty by Galbatorix in the ancient language, binding them to his will. Meanwhile, the battle proceeds, with the Twins revealing themselves and causing massive losses among the Varden, until Roran kills them.

Murtagh and Eragon resume their fight, with Murtagh easily defeating Eragon through magic. He shows mercy to him, on account of their old friendship, but takes Eragon's sword Zar'roc, which he claims to be his inheritance, revealing that he and Eragon are brothers, making Eragon a son of Morzan, the first of the traitorous Riders known as the Forsworn who was later killed by Brom.

Ultimately, the Varden win the battle. The book ends as Roran asks Eragon for help in rescuing Katrina, to which he agrees.

== Critical reaction ==
Eldest received generally mixed reviews, and was met with criticism similar to Eragon for its derivative nature. School Library Journal noted that Eldest lacked originality, but would still find reception among fans. It also acknowledged that themes of Eldest are based generally on the works of other writers. BookBrowse also criticized Eldest, but said, as School Library Journal noted, that nothing the reviewers can say will stop some children from reading the book. Entertainment Weekly rated Eldest as one of the worst five books of 2005, calling it a "700-page drag." The Boston Globe gave a negative review for Eldest, criticizing the very low points and for "drama that rises to a wet pop." The Christian Science Monitor gave Eldest a C+ grade. Similar to other reviews, it criticized the long plot and its similarities to The Lord of the Rings and Star Wars, as well as the lack of humor. The review commented that Roran, one of the secondary major characters, had the best part of the book. SFSignal also gave Eldest a poor review, giving it one out of five stars. The main reason of this was for its dull pace. The SFSignal review, like The Christian Science Monitor, did say that Roran had the "strongest sequence" in the book.

However, there were also some more positive reviews of Eldest. Bookmarks magazine saw Eldest's similarity to other works, but said that Eldest displayed more emotional depth than Eragon. Publishers Weekly also gave a positive review for Eldest, praising the revelations in the final pages. Barnes & Noble gave a positive review for Eldest, in particular for its style, characters and themes such as friendship, forgiveness, responsibility, and honor. Eldest won the 2006 Quill Award in Young Adult Literature. Eldest also was nominated for a British Book Award in the Children's Book of the Year section, the Disney Adventures Book Award, the Colorado Blue Spruce Award, Young Adult Book Award, and the Wyoming Soaring Eagle Book Award.

== Themes ==
Several themes in Eldest have been noted. A Barnes & Noble reviewer praised the honor, friendship, responsibility, and forgiveness in the book. The reviewer called these themes "age-transcendent". School Library Journal commented on how Eragon looked for a definition for good and evil. A third review, while not identifying any specific themes, said the author was "layering his themes" to make the book more exciting. Another review praised the story for the themes of power, family, and maturing. Paolini commented on the theme in Eldest of vegetarianism:

"One of my goals as an author is to explore various aspects of human nature. It's my job, then, to attempt to understand why people act, even if it differs from my own point of view or practice, and to present those reasons to the best of my ability. The actions and beliefs of my characters are not necessarily my own."

There are also themes of religion and atheism, the dwarves being highly religious, the elves being atheists, and Eragon, growing up without a religious background but a set of superstitions, wondering if there are higher powers.

== Literary style and genre ==
Eldest falls in the genre of juvenile fiction and fantasy. Reviews often commented on how Eldest borrowed from the fantasy genre. Other reviews criticized and praised the writing style of the author. Los Angeles Times, while noting that the writing was more mature, criticized the novel for being inconsistent. An Entertainment Weekly review was negative toward the story because it was slow-paced, while The Washington Post said Eldest needed to be shortened. A reviewer from The Boston Globe said:

"He is to English as a bad dog to a chainsaw: he worries it, and worries it, and devastation spreads around him."

On the other hand, Barnes & Noble called the writing style fluid and Children's Literature praised the story for being richly detailed. Kirkus Reviews compared the story to a patchwork of fantasy elements and characters, then concluded that it, despite being derivative, was exciting and held together well.

== Limited editions ==
A deluxe version of Eldest called the "Limited Edition" was released on September 26, 2006. It was published by Random House. The deluxe edition included an excerpt of Brisingr, a poster of Glaedr (which would become the cover art for Brisingr), the history of Alagaësia, art by Christopher Paolini, and a list of characters, places, objects, and dwarf clans. The deluxe edition was also released in an Ebook format.

Eldest has been published in forty-one countries, several translations from English into different languages have been made. Translations for languages such as Spanish, Portuguese, and Serbian have appeared. Worldwide Eldest has several publishers including Gailivro, which publishes the Polish and Portuguese Eldest, and Gramedia Pustaka Utama, the publisher of the Indonesian translations.

An omnibus of Eragon and Eldest was published on July 8, 2008, and included then-unseen manuscripts by Paolini.
