= Eragon =

2002 book by Christopher Paolini

- Penguin Random House Verlagsgruppe edition cover by John Jude Palencar, featuring the blue dragon Saphira
- Author: Christopher Paolini
- Illustrator: John Jude Palencar
- Cover artist: John Jude Palencar
- Language: English
- Series: The Inheritance Cycle
- Release number: 1
- Genre: Young adult Fantasy; Bildungsroman
- Publisher: Paolini LLC (first edition), Alfred A. Knopf
- Publication date: 2002 (first edition), August 26, 2003 (Knopf)
- Publication place: United States
- Media type: Print (hardback & paperback) and audio-CD
- Pages: 509 (Knopf); 544 (Paolini LLC)
- ISBN: 0-375-82668-8 (First Knopf edition) ISBN 0-9666213-3-6 (Paolini LLC)
- OCLC: 52251450
- Dewey Decimal: [Fic] 21
- LC Class: PZ7.P19535 Er 2003
- Followed by: Eldest

Eragon is the first book in The Inheritance Cycle by American fantasy writer Christopher Paolini. Paolini, born in 1983, began writing the novel after graduating from home school at the age of fifteen. After writing the first draft for a year, Paolini spent a second year rewriting and fleshing out the story and characters. His parents saw the final manuscript and in 2001 decided to self-publish Eragon; Paolini spent a year traveling around the United States promoting the novel. The book was discovered by novelist Carl Hiaasen, who brought it to the attention of Alfred A. Knopf. The re-published version was released on August 26, 2003.

The book tells the story of a farm boy named Eragon, who finds a mysterious stone in the mountains. The stone is revealed to be an egg, and a dragon named Saphira hatches from it. When the evil King Galbatorix finds out about the egg, he sends monstrous servants to acquire it, forcing Eragon and Saphira to flee with a storyteller named Brom, who teaches them the ways of the Dragon Riders.

Eragon was the third-best-selling children's hardback book of 2003, and the second-best-selling paperback of 2005. It placed on the New York Times Children's Books Best Seller list for 121 weeks and was adapted as a feature film of the same name that was released on December 15, 2006.

== Background ==
=== Origins and publication ===
Christopher Paolini started reading fantasy books when he was 10 years old. At the age of 14, as a hobby, he started writing a novel, endeavoring to create the sort of fantasy story that he himself would enjoy reading. However, he could not get beyond a few pages because he had "no idea" where he was going. He began reading everything he could about the "art of writing", and then plotted the whole Inheritance Cycle book series. After a month of planning out the series, he started writing the draft of Eragon by hand. It was finished a year later, and Paolini began writing the second draft of the book. After another year of editing, Paolini's parents saw the final manuscript. They immediately saw its potential and decided to publish the book through their small, home-based publishing company, Paolini International. Paolini created the cover art for this edition of Eragon, which featured Saphira's eye on the cover. He also drew the maps inside the book.

Paolini and his family toured across the United States promoting the book. He gave over 135 talks at bookshops, libraries, and schools, many with Paolini dressed up in a medieval costume; but the book did not receive much attention. Paolini said he "would stand behind a table in (his) costume talking all day without a break – and would sell maybe forty books in eight hours if (he) did really well. [...] It was a very stressful experience. (He) couldn't have gone on for very much longer." In the summer of 2002, American novelist Carl Hiaasen was on vacation in one of the cities that Paolini gave a talk in. While there, Hiaasen's stepson bought a copy of Eragon that he "immediately loved". He showed it to Hiaasen, who brought the book to the attention of the publishing house Alfred A. Knopf. Michelle Frey, executive editor at Knopf, contacted Paolini and his family to ask if they were interested in having Knopf publish Eragon. The Paolinis accepted it, and after another round of editing, Knopf published Eragon in August 2003, with a new cover drawn by John Jude Palencar.

=== Inspiration and influences ===
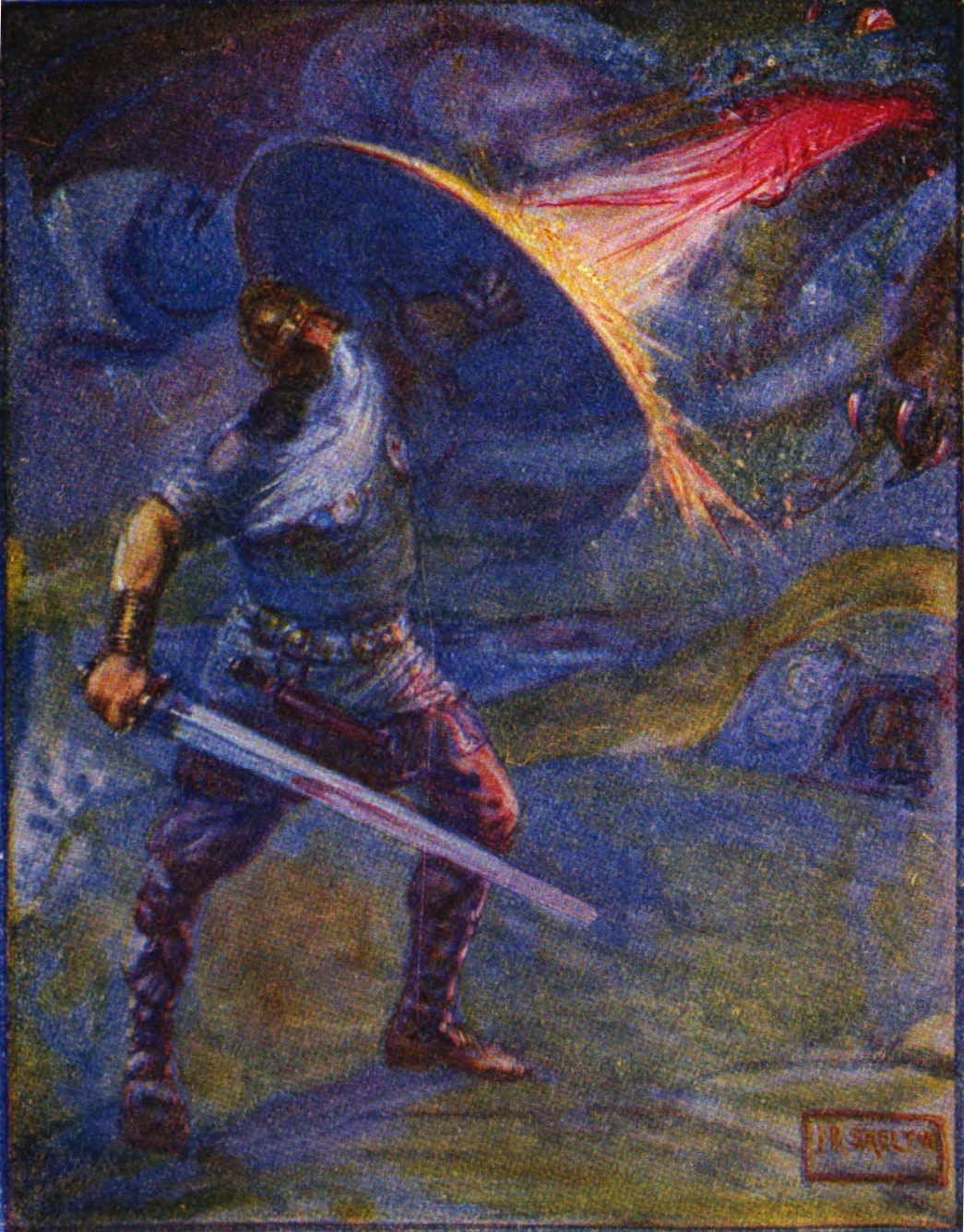
An illustration of Beowulf fighting the dragon (1908). Paolini received much inspiration from old epic poems.

Paolini cites old myths, folk tales, medieval stories, the epic poem Beowulf, and authors J. R. R. Tolkien and E. R. Eddison as his biggest influences in writing. Other literary influences include David Eddings, Andre Norton, Brian Jacques, Anne McCaffrey, Raymond E. Feist, Mervyn Peake, Ursula K. Le Guin, Frank Herbert, Philip Pullman, and Garth Nix.

The ancient language used by the elves in Eragon is based "almost entirely" on Old Norse, German, Anglo Saxon, and Russian myth. Paolini commented: "[I] did a god-awful amount of research into the subject when I was composing it. I found that it gave the world a much richer feel, a much older feel, using these words that had been around for centuries and centuries. I had a lot of fun with that." Picking the right names for the characters and places was a process that took "days, weeks, or even years". Paolini said: "if I have difficulty choosing the correct moniker, I use a placeholder name until a replacement suggests itself." He added that he was "really lucky" with the name Eragon, "because it's just dragon with one letter changed." Also, Paolini commented that he thought of both parts of the name "Eragon"—"era" and "gone"—as if the name itself changes the era in which the character lives. He thought the name fit the book perfectly, but some of the other names caused him "real headaches".

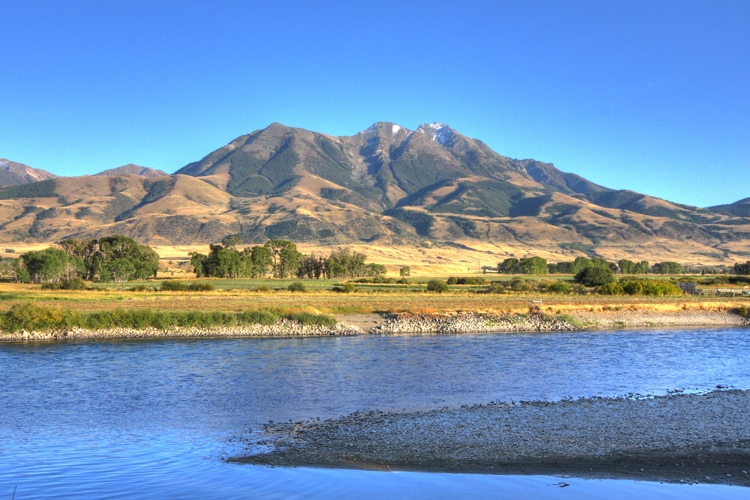
Paolini received inspiration from Paradise Valley, Montana (Emigrant Peak pictured, as viewed from west bank of Yellowstone River)

The landscape in Eragon is based on the "wild territory" of Paolini's home state, Montana. He said in an interview: "I go hiking a lot, and oftentimes when I'm in the forest or in the mountains, sitting down and seeing some of those little details makes the difference between having an okay description and having a unique description." Paolini also said that Paradise Valley, Montana is "one of the main sources" of his inspiration for the landscape in the book (Eragon takes place in the fictional continent Alagaësia). Paolini "roughed out" the main history of the land before he wrote the book, but he did not draw a map of it until it became important to see where Eragon was traveling. He then started to get history and plot ideas from seeing the landscape depicted.

Paolini chose to have Eragon mature throughout the book because, "for one thing, it's one of the archetypal fantasy elements". He thought Eragon's growth and maturation throughout the book "sort of mirrored my own growing abilities as a writer and as a person, too. So it was a very personal choice for that book." Eragon's dragon, Saphira, was imagined as "the perfect friend" by Paolini. He decided to go in a more "human direction" with her because she is raised away from her own species, in "close mental contact" with a human. "I considered making the dragon more dragon-like, if you will, in its own society, but I haven't had a chance to explore that. I went with a more human element with Saphira while still trying to get a bit of the magic, the alien, of her race." Paolini made Saphira the "best friend anyone could have: loyal, funny, brave, intelligent, and noble. She transcended that, however, and became her own person, fiercely independent and proud." Saphira's blue tinted vision was in turn inspired by Paolini's own color-blindness.

Paolini deliberately included archetypal elements of a fantasy novel like a quest, a journey of experience, revenge, romance, betrayal, and a unique sword. The book is described as a fantasy, and Booklist observed: "Paolini knows the genre well—his lush tale is full of recognizable fantasy elements and conventions". Kirkus Reviews called the book a "high fantasy"; other reviewers have compared it to other books and films of the fantasy genre, such as Star Wars and The Lord of the Rings, and in some instances stated Eragon's plot is too similar to those other stories.

== Plot summary ==
A Shade named Durza, along with a group of Urgals, ambushes a party of three elves. They kill two of them, and Durza attempts to steal an egg carried by the remaining female elf. However, she manages to use magic to teleport it elsewhere. Infuriated, Durza abducts her and keeps her prisoner at the city of Gil'ead.

Eragon is a fifteen-year-old boy who has lived with his uncle Garrow and cousin Roran on a farm near the village of Carvahall, left there by his mother 15 years before. While hunting, he sees a large explosion and finds a blue dragon egg in the rubble. Later on, a dragon hatchling emerges from the egg, and bonds with Eragon, giving him a silver mark on his hand. Eragon names the dragon Saphira, after a name the old village storyteller Brom mentions.

He raises the dragon in secret until two of King Galbatorix's servants, the Ra'zac, come to Carvahall. Eragon and Saphira escape and hide in the Spine, but Garrow is fatally wounded and the farm is burned down by the Ra'zac. Once Garrow dies, Eragon and Saphira decide to hunt the Ra'zac, in vengeance. Brom insists on accompanying him and Saphira, and gives Eragon the sword Zar'roc.

Eragon becomes a Dragon Rider, through his bond with Saphira. He is the only known Rider in Alagaësia other than King Galbatorix, who, with the help of the now-dead Forsworn, a group of rogue Riders, killed every other Rider a century ago. As they travel, Brom teaches Eragon sword fighting, magic, the ancient elvish language, and the ways of the Dragon Riders.

They travel to the city of Teirm, where they meet with Brom's friend Jeod. Eragon's fortune is told by the witch Angela, and her companion, the werecat Solembum, gives Eragon mysterious advice. With Jeod's help, they track the Ra'zac to the city of Dras-Leona. They manage to infiltrate the city, but are forced to flee after a run-in with the Ra'zac. That night, they are ambushed by the Ra'zac. A stranger named Murtagh rescues them, but Brom is mortally wounded. Brom gives Eragon his blessing, reveals that he was once a Dragon Rider, bonded with a dragon also named Saphira, and dies. Saphira uses magic to encase Brom in a diamond tomb.

Murtagh becomes Eragon's new companion and they travel to the city of Gil'ead, seeking information on how to find the Varden, a group of rebels who seek the downfall of Galbatorix. Near Gil'ead, Eragon is captured and imprisoned in a jail that holds a female elf he had had recurring dreams about. Murtagh and Saphira stage a rescue, and Eragon takes the unconscious elf with him. After fighting Durza, Murtagh seemingly kills him with an arrow shot through his head, and they escape. Eragon telepathically communicates with the elf, named Arya, who reveals she had sent the egg to him accidentally. From her, he learns the location of the Varden. Murtagh is reluctant to journey to the Varden, revealing that he is the son of Morzan, former leader of the Forsworn.

An army of Kull, elite Urgals, chases Eragon to the Varden's headquarters, but is driven off by the Varden, who escort Eragon, Saphira, Murtagh, and Arya to Farthen Dûr, their mountain hideout. Eragon meets the leader of the Varden, Ajihad. Ajihad imprisons Murtagh after he refuses to allow his mind to be read, to determine his allegiance. Eragon is told by Ajihad that Murtagh failed to kill Durza, as the only way to kill a Shade is with a stab through the heart. Orik, nephew of the dwarf King Hrothgar, is appointed as Eragon and Saphira's guide. Eragon also meets Ajihad's daughter, Nasuada, and Ajihad's right-hand man, Jörmundur. He runs into Angela and Solembum again, and visits Murtagh in prison. He is tested by two magicians, The Twins, as well as Arya.

Eragon and the Varden are then attacked by an immense Urgal army. Eragon personally battles Durza again, and, after a mental battle, is overwhelmed by Durza, who slashes him across the back. Arya and Saphira shatter Isidar Mithrim, a large sapphire that formed the roof of the chamber, to distract Durza, allowing Eragon to stab him through the heart with his sword. He falls into a coma, and is visited telepathically by a stranger, who tells Eragon to visit him in the Elven capital, Ellesméra. He wakes up with a scar across his back, and resolves to journey to Ellesméra.

== Reception ==
Eragon received generally mixed reviews and was criticized for its derivative nature. Liz Rosenberg of The New York Times Book Review criticized Eragon for having "clichéd descriptions", "B-movie dialogue", "awkward and gangly prose". However, she concluded the review by noting that "for all its flaws, it is an authentic work of great talent." School Library Journal wrote that in Eragon "sometimes the magic solutions are just too convenient for getting out of difficult situations." Common Sense Media called Eragon's dialogue "long-winded" and "clichéd", with a plot "straight out of Star Wars by way of The Lord of the Rings, with bits of other great fantasies thrown in here and there..." The website did concede that the book is a notable achievement for such a young author, and that it would be "appreciated" by younger fans.

Favorable reviews of Eragon often focused on the book's characters and plot. IGN's Matt Casamassina called the book "entertaining", and added that "Paolini demonstrates that he understands how to hold the reader's eyes and this is what ultimately separates Eragon from countless other me-too fantasy novels." Chris Lawrence of About.com thought the book had all the "traditional ingredients" that make a fantasy novel "enjoyable". The book was a "fun read" for him because it is "quick and exciting" and "packed" with action and magic. Lawrence concluded his review by giving the book a rating of 3.8/5, commenting that "the characters are interesting, the plot is engrossing, and you know the good guy will win in the end."

Eragon was the third best-selling children's hardback book of 2003, and the second best-selling children's paperback of 2005. It placed on the New York Times Children's Books Best Seller list for 121 weeks. In 2006, the novel was awarded with a Nene Award by the children of Hawaii. It won the Rebecca Caudill Young Reader's Book Award and the Young Reader's Choice Award the same year.

== Adaptations ==
=== Film ===
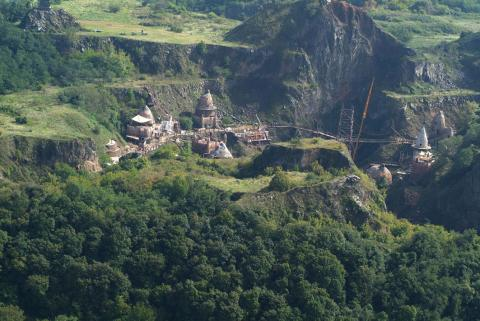
Aerial photography of the Ság Mountain, which served as the backdrop for Farthen Dûr in the film adaptation of the book.

A film adaptation of Eragon was released in the United States on December 15, 2006. Plans to create the film were first announced in February 2004, when 20th Century Fox purchased the rights to Eragon. The film was directed by first-timer Stefen Fangmeier, and written by Peter Buchman. Edward Speleers was selected for the role of Eragon. Over the following months, Jeremy Irons, John Malkovich, Chris Egan and Djimon Hounsou were all confirmed as joining the cast. Principal photography for the film took place in Hungary and Slovakia.

The film received mostly negative reviews, garnering a 16% approval rating at Rotten Tomatoes; the tenth worst of 2006. The Seattle Times described it as "technically accomplished, but fairly lifeless and at times a bit silly". The Hollywood Reporter said the world of Eragon was "without much texture or depth". The story was labelled "derivative" by The Washington Post, and "generic" by the Las Vegas Weekly. Newsday stressed this point further, asserting that only "nine-year-olds with no knowledge whatsoever of any of the six Star Wars movies" would find the film original. The acting was called "lame" by the Washington Post, as well as "stilted" and "lifeless" by the Orlando Weekly. The dialogue was also criticized: MSNBC labelled it "silly"; the Las Vegas Weekly called it "wooden". Positive reviews described the film as "fun" and "the stuff boys' fantasies are made of". The CGI work was called "imaginative" and Saphira was called a "magnificent creation". Paolini stated he enjoyed the film, particularly praising the performances of Jeremy Irons and Ed Speleers.

Eragon grossed approximately $75 million in the United States and $173.9 million elsewhere, totaling $249 million worldwide. It is the fifth highest-grossing film with a dragon at its focal point, and the sixth highest-grossing film of the sword and sorcery subgenre. Eragon was in release for seventeen weeks in the United States, opening on December 15, 2006, and closing on April 9, 2007. It opened in 3,020 theaters, earning $8.7 million on opening day and $23.2 million across opening weekend, ranking second behind The Pursuit of Happyness. Eragon's $75 million total United States gross was the thirty-first highest for 2006. The film earned $30.3 million in its opening weekend across 76 overseas markets, making it the #1 film worldwide. The film's $249 million total worldwide gross was the sixteenth highest for 2006.

=== Television series ===
In June 2021, Christopher Paolini tweeted #EragonRemake in an effort to get Disney, the intellectual rights holders following their acquisition of 21st Century Fox, to revamp the book series into a possible television show for Disney+. Within hours, the hashtag began to trend with fans pushing for a proper adaptation. On July 25, 2022, Variety reported that a live action television series adaptation of Eragon was in early development for Disney+, with Paolini serving as a co-writer on the series, and with Bert Salke executive producing. In February 2026, it was announced that the project was moving forward at the streaming service with High Potential and Superman & Lois showrunners Todd Harthan and Todd Helbing as co-creators and executive producers alongside Paolini. Marc Webb signed to be one of the series writers and producer and that a writers room opened late last year and is currently ongoing.
