= Inheritance (Paolini novel) =

2011 fantasy fiction novel by Christopher Paolini

- The English cover of Inheritance, featuring the green dragon Fírnen
- Author: Christopher Paolini
- Cover artist: John Jude Palencar
- Language: English
- Series: The Inheritance Cycle
- Release number: 4
- Genre: Fantasy
- Publisher: Alfred A. Knopf
- Publication date: November 8, 2011
- Publication place: United States
- Media type: Print (hardcover and paperback), audiobook, and e-book
- Pages: 860
- ISBN: 978-0375856112
- Preceded by: Brisingr

Inheritance (or The Vault of Souls) is a 2011 fantasy fiction novel written by American author Christopher Paolini. It is the fourth and final novel in The Inheritance Cycle tetralogy.

The Inheritance Cycle was originally intended to be a trilogy, but Paolini has stated that during writing, the length of the third book, Brisingr, grew, and the book was split into two parts to be published separately. Because of this, many plot elements originally intended for Brisingr are in Inheritance.

Since the release of Inheritance, Paolini has expressed his interest in expanding upon Alagaësia and the Inheritance Cycle. In an interview, he talked about a potential "book five", a prequel centering on Brom, and said that he has planned "around seven more stories set in Alagaësia—and one of those is in fact a series."

== Development ==
=== Decision for a fourth book ===
In a video that was released on October 30, 2007, Paolini stated that during the work on the third book, he realized it would become too long and so he decided to split it into two separate books. His explanation is as follows:

I plotted out the Inheritance series as a trilogy nine years ago, when I was fifteen. At that time, I never imagined I’d write all three books, much less that they would be published. When I finally delved into Book Three [Brisingr], it soon became obvious that the remainder of the story was far too big to fit in one volume. Having spent so long thinking about the series as a trilogy, it was difficult for me to realize that, in order to be true to my characters and to address all of the plot points and unanswered questions Eragon and Eldest raised, I needed to split the end of the series into two books.

— Christopher Paolini

=== Publication announcement ===
On March 23, 2011, Random House announced the title, cover artwork, and release date of Inheritance. It was released on November 8, 2011 in the United States, Canada, United Kingdom, India, Australia, and Hungary. It was released with a first print of 2.5 million copies.

== Plot ==
The Varden attack the Empire city of Belatona. In the battle, Saphira, Eragon's dragon, is nearly killed by a Dauthdaert, a spear from the Dragon Wars that can bypass magical wards and kill dragons. Belatona is captured by the Varden, and an alliance is later formed between the Varden and the werecats.

Afterwards, Eragon's cousin Roran is sent on a mission to capture Aroughs, which he succeeds at using unconventional tactics. Roran rejoins the Varden at Dras-Leona, which proves difficult to take, as it is under protection by Murtagh and his dragon Thorn. Jeod finds information about a possible entrance to the city via an incomplete sewer system under it.

Eragon, Arya, Angela, the werecat Solembum, and an elf named Wyrden enter this sewer system, to sneak into the city and open the gates. However, the mission goes awry, as the tunnels are used by the priests of Helgrind, who separate the group, slay Wyrden, and capture Eragon and Arya. The priests worship the Ra'zac, and attempt to feed Eragon and Arya to Ra'zac hatchlings, although Angela and Solembum save them. Eragon is then able to open the city gates and defeat Murtagh and Thorn, allowing the Varden to take the city. As Eragon and Arya become drunk to celebrate their victory, Murtagh and Thorn attack their camp and capture Nasuada. In her absence, Eragon is appointed as the leader of the Varden, as they march on to Urû'baen, the capital of the Empire.

Eragon struggles under the weight of command, and recalls Solembum's previous advice, instructing him to journey to the Rock of Kuthian and open the Vault of Souls. As nobody has knowledge of the Rock, he questions Solembum, discovering that he had given the advice on instinct. During the conversation, Solembum appears to be possessed, helping Eragon discover that the Rock is located on Vroengard Island, and protected by magic which causes everyone, barring himself and Saphira, to forget about it upon hearing of it. He informs Arya and Glaedr of this, and decides to journey to Vroengard with Saphira. Glaedr joins them, with Arya staying behind to maintain an illusion that Eragon has not left.

On the island, Eragon and Saphira find the Rock and learn that they must speak their true names to enter the Vault of Souls. Eventually, they find their true names and gain entry. Inside, they find a hoard of Eldunarí and dragon eggs, hidden before Galbatorix destroyed the Riders. Umaroth, the dragon who leads the Eldunarí, decides to join Eragon to overthrow Galbatorix. They journey to Urû'baen, under siege by the combined forces of the Varden, elves, werecats, Urgals and dwarves.

Eragon reveals the Eldunarí to the army's leaders, and they plan their attack. Their combined forces attack Urû'baen while Eragon, Saphira, Arya, Elva, and elven spellcasters break into Galbatorix's citadel. After overcoming a series of traps and being separated from the spellcasters, they reach the throne room. There, Galbatorix easily subdues them, and reveals that he has learned the true name of the ancient language, referred to as the Word. With it, he is able to control the usage of magic with the ancient language, negating any spoken spells.

To amuse himself, he orders Murtagh and Eragon to fight using only their swords. Eragon defeats Murtagh, and urges him to join his side. Murtagh, who had developed feelings for Nasuada in her captivity, has his true name changed, and turns on Galbatorix, using the Word to strip him of his wards. Galbatorix incapacitates Murtagh, and battles Eragon, while Saphira and Thorn battle his dragon Shruikan. With the Eldunarí, Eragon casts a spell to make Galbatorix experience the pain and suffering that he has caused, while Arya kills Shruikan with the Dauthdaert. Overwhelmed with guilt, Galbatorix uses magic to destroy himself and most of the citadel, although Eragon is able to protect those in it.

To heal from their ordeal, Murtagh and Thorn decide to journey far away, teaching Eragon the Word before departing. Nasuada becomes the High Queen of Alagaësia and King Orrin of Surda grudgingly pledges his allegiance to her. Arya returns to Ellesmera to help choose a new queen for the elves after the death of her mother, Islanzadí, in battle. She takes the remaining dragon egg, which hatches for her, and she names the dragon Fírnen. She is also chosen as the new queen.

Eragon realizes that there is no safe place to raise the dragons and train new Riders in Alagaësia. He thus decides to sail away with the Eldunarí and the eggs to a region far east of Alagaësia. Eragon reworks the magic of the pact between Riders and dragons to allow dwarves and Urgals to become Riders, and leaves two eggs for each of the races. The future Riders will travel to Eragon for training, while eggs will be periodically sent back to Alagaësia. Eragon and Saphira sadly say their farewells to their friends and family, but look forward to the future.

== Critical reception ==
Inheritance debuted at No. 1 on the USA Today's "Best-Selling Books" list, selling nearly half a million copies on the first day in the United States.

The book received mixed reviews. Joshua Hill of Book Fantasy Review wrote that Inheritance was an improvement over previous books in the series and praised the characters of Roran, Arya, and Murtagh as "three of the most interesting characters I've ever had the pleasure to read". However, Hill criticized the plot for being overly reliant on magic and the ending as being too similar to the final three chapters of The Lord of the Rings. The Washington Post's Yvonne Zipp noted that, although the book is marketed to young adults, certain content may be too violent for younger readers, such as the scenes in which Nasuada is tortured and Arya's hand is degloved while trying to escape from shackles.

Some reviews criticized the novel for being overly detailed and leaving unresolved plot threads. Shelby Scoffield of Deseret News called the book "a sophisticated novel" and "a sense of closure to a truly great series", but criticized Paolini's use of "long and boring details". Richard Marcus of the Seattle P-I said that "Paolini clutters up the book with page upon page of battles that could just as easily taken place off stage" and that "the last hundred or so pages of the book are spent in a very awkward attempt to tie up all the loose ends". He also says that, "In fact by wasting so much time on insignificant details along the way, the final confrontation with Galbatorix when it comes feels rushed. Even worse, discovering the location of the Rock of Kuthian and the Vault of Souls feels incredibly contrived."
